= Kurpie paper cutout =

Polish folk art

Kurpie paper cutouts (Polish: wycinanka kurpiowska) are decorations cut out of paper with scissors, characteristic of the folk art of the Kurpie people of Puszcza Zielona and Puszcza Biała. In March 2020, the paper cutting tradition of Puszcza Zielona was entered into the National List of Intangible Cultural Heritage as "Kurpie paper cutting from Puszcza Zielona".

The paper cutout first appeared in the homes of the Kurpie Zielone and Kurpie Białe people in the 19th century as a decorative element. From the beginning of the 20th century, it began to gain popularity in urban circles, which particularly influenced the development of forms in Puszcza Zielona. The art was revived after World War II, partly thanks to the support of the Cepelia cooperative. Its collapse ended the period of institutional state support for this form of folk art, which was of particular importance for Puszcza Biała, where paper cutting disappeared. In Puszcza Zielona, the art form has survived uninterrupted thanks to the support of museums and the interest of audiences during regional events. Today, a revival of paper cutting can be observed in Puszcza Biała.

Cutouts from Puszcza Biała and Puszcza Zielona are preserved in many museums in the region and throughout Poland. They include stars, lilies (leluje), forests, sacramental bread (hostyje), figurative cutouts characteristic of Kurpie Zielone and Kurpie Białe, potted plants (zielka), and ribbons. Kurpie paper cutout artists have received and continue to receive recognition at the local, national, and international levels.

Kurpie paper cutouts are used on postcards, the covers of publications, as motifs on souvenirs, and as decorations in churches, on vestments, welcome signs, and monuments, among others. This is especially evident in Puszcza Zielona, where paper cutouts are one of the region's symbols. Today, they are often used in ethno-design.

== Paper cutouts from Puszcza Biała ==
=== History ===
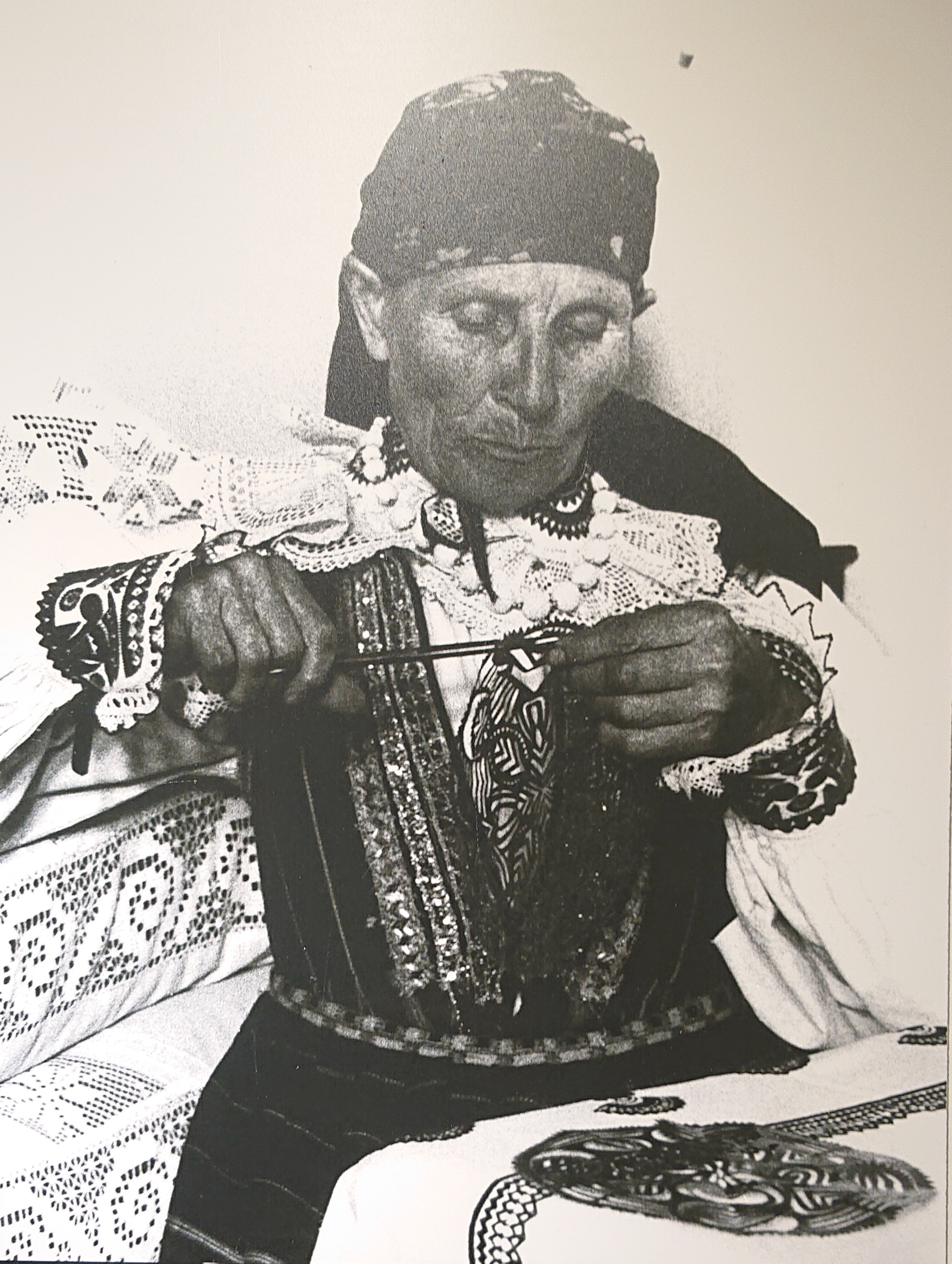
Paper cutting artist from Puszcza Biała. Photograph from an exhibition at the Museum of Kurpie Culture in Ostrołęka

Two paper cutting centers developed in Puszcza Biała in the villages of Dąbrowa and Pniewo. According to Aleksander Błachowski, both Puszcza Biała and Puszcza Zielona had similar forms, differing only in details. Early paper cutouts from Puszcza Biała shared many traits with those from Puszcza Zielona. The development of paper cutting was influenced by the annual competition between housewives who decorated their homes before Easter. As a result, new patterns were created and the technique was perfected. At the beginning of the 20th century, paper cutting of Kurpie Białe gained popularity, but it retained archaic forms, likely due to a lack of interest from the townspeople of Pułtusk. Artists created cutouts for their own use and sold them only to local customers, which helped preserve the traditional forms and the original function.

There are two categories of cutouts from Puszcza Biała: monochrome and colorful paste-ons (nalepianki). Monochrome cutouts include zielka – cut from a single piece of paper in the shape of a potted plant with symmetrical leaves – and stars. There were also multicolored zielka. They took the form of three strips decorated with flowers, roosters, or people, and in some cases, three strips of paper topped with small circles were attached to a pot made of multicolored circles glued together. Stars were cut out as circles with a radially arranged openwork geometric ornament, then glued with a disc of paper in a contrasting color, with one or more rosettes pasted onto them. Another type of nalepianka is the ribbon, a form typical of Puszcza Biała, likely derived from crêpe paper ribbons attached to picture frames. The ribbons were made of two strips that, after gluing, spread downward, with a contrasting star placed at the join. The strips were divided into three or four fields with glued openwork rosettes. Known as portki, the ribbons were mainly red, green, and yellow.

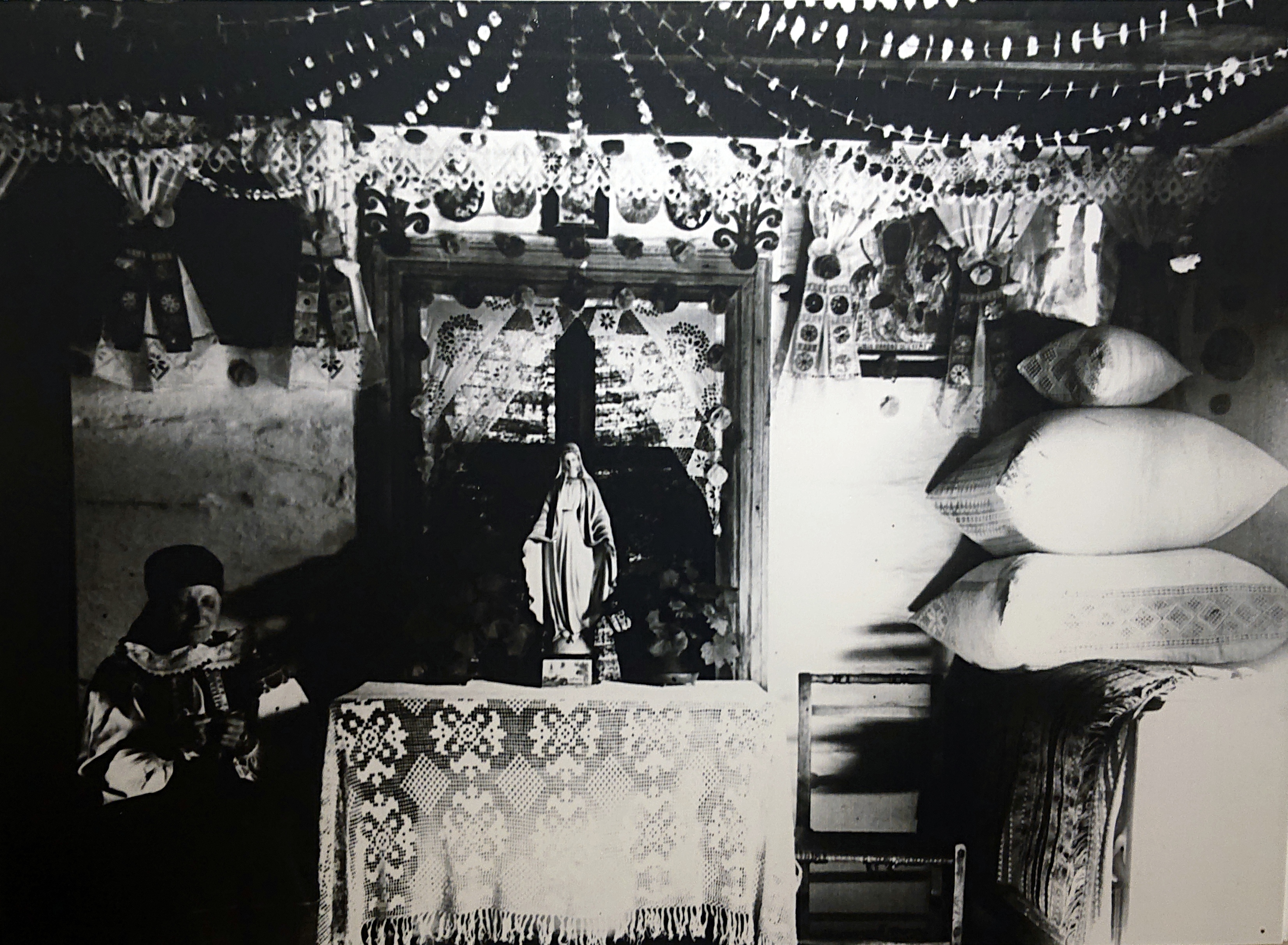
Paper cutting artist in a Kurpie Białe cottage decorated with cutouts and a straw mobile (pająk). Photograph from an exhibition at the Museum of Kurpie Culture in Ostrołęka

Cutouts from Puszcza Biała depicted people, roosters, and birds, either individually or in pairs. Artists glued colorful scraps of paper as wings, tails, and combs of birds, with women dominating among the human figures. There were also more elaborate compositions with uhlans, horses harnessed to carriages, and peasants working in the fields, though these forms disappeared.

Maria Żywirska observed that the decline of Kurpie Białe paper cutting began during the interwar period. The art revived after World War II, when local and state authorities organized competitions and thematic exhibitions, which contributed to the development of a group of folk artists. At that time, paper cutouts were created not only for personal use, but also for sale, and younger generations learned the craft from their grandmothers and great-grandmothers. The artists developed their own patterns that reflected the characteristics of the region, and – as in Puszcza Zielona – certain families became famous for the craft. Men were involved in paper cutting, though there were much fewer of them (as in Puszcza Zielona).

Despite the efforts of the Kurpie Creativity Cepelia Cooperative in Pułtusk and post-war competitions, the paper cutting traditions of Puszcza Biała disappeared. The population of the region was more open to contacts with Warsaw and outside influences than Puszcza Zielona communities, which contributed to acculturation. Individual artists were unable to ensure the continuity of the tradition. Paper cutting lost its original meaning and was replaced by other decorations, instead finding its way into museums or private collections of researchers and enthusiasts of this art form.

Today, there are local initiatives to preserve the memory and recreate the tradition of paper cutting. Some artists still create Kurpie Białe paper cutouts. The Puszcza Biała – My Little Homeland Association, which oversees the Kuźnia Kurpiowska cultural center in Pniewo, plays an active role in these efforts.

=== Notable paper cutting artists from Puszcza Biała ===
- Marianna Świadkowska from Wypychy, Gmina Somianka;
- Małgorzata Murziak;
- Wiesława Archacka, Katarzyna Osowiecka, Teresa Włodarczyk, Genowefa Łada, Stefania Woźnica, and Władysław Kamińska from Rząśnik;
- Emilia Fornalska from Bartodzieje;
- Genowefa Światkowska;
- Halina Witkowska from Lemany.

=== Gallery ===
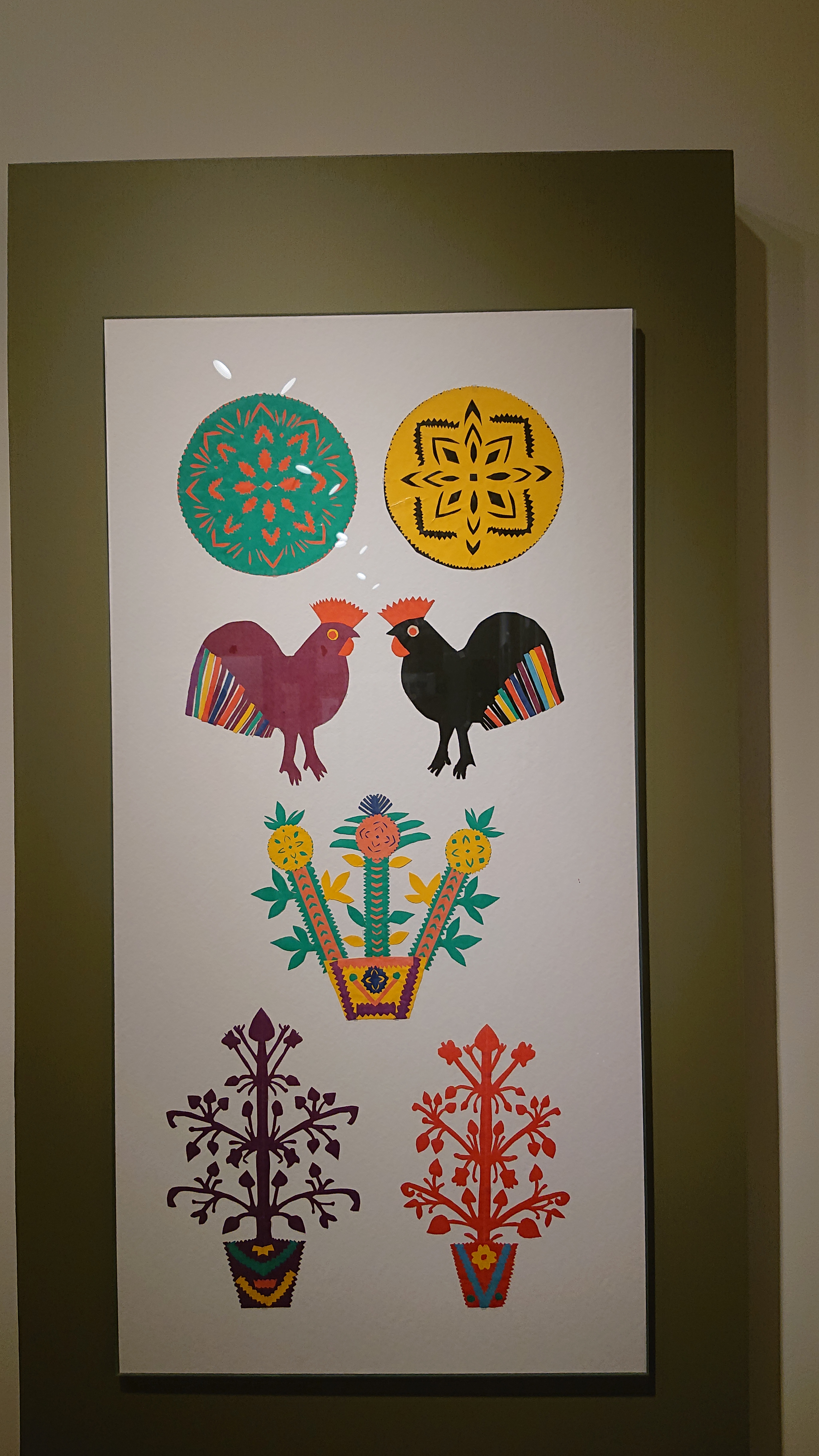
Paper cutouts by Teresa Włodarczyk from Obryte, Museum of Kurpie Culture in Ostrołęka

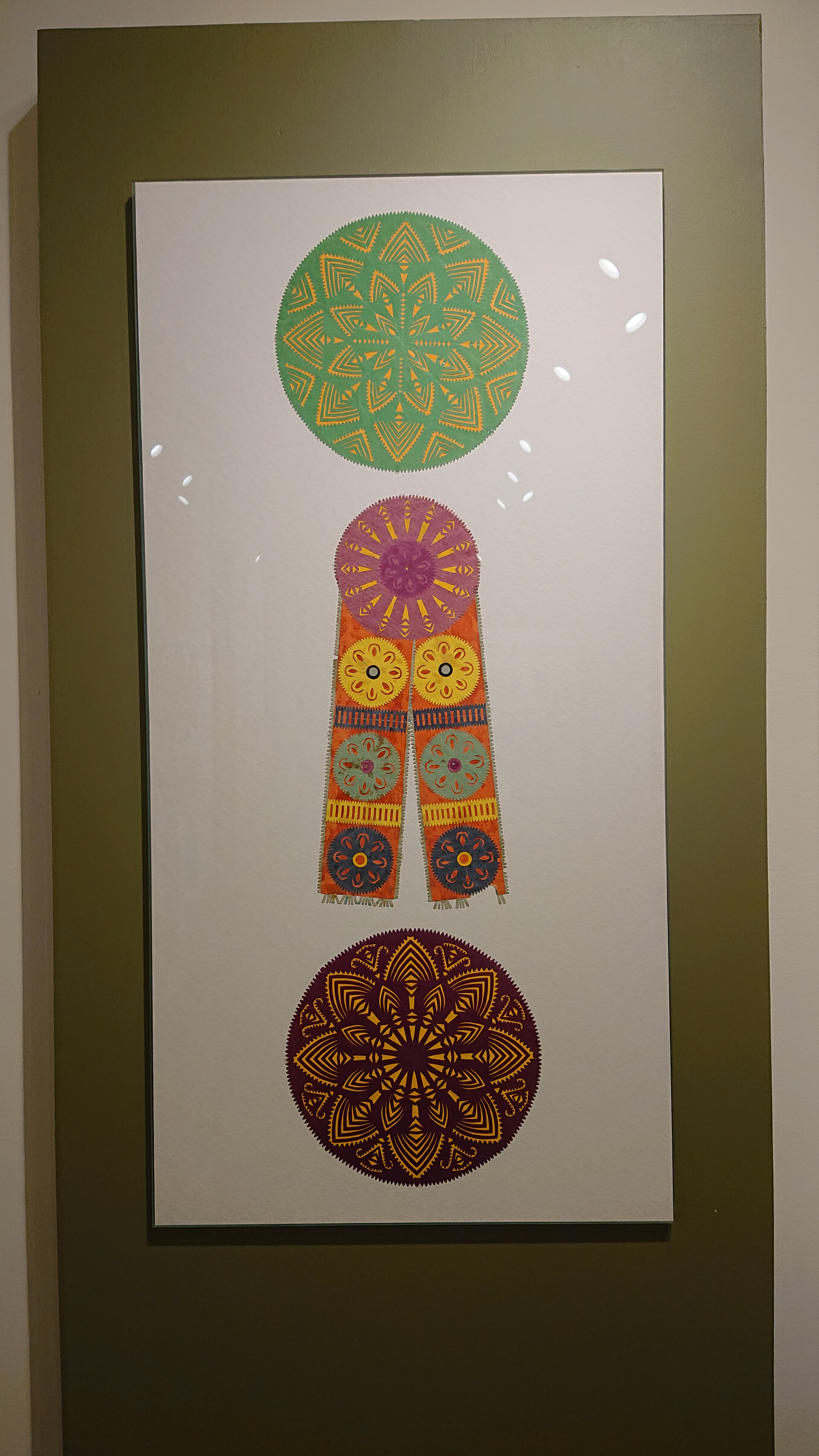
Paper cutouts by Aleksandra Liwska from Dąbrowa, Museum of Kurpie Culture in Ostrołęka

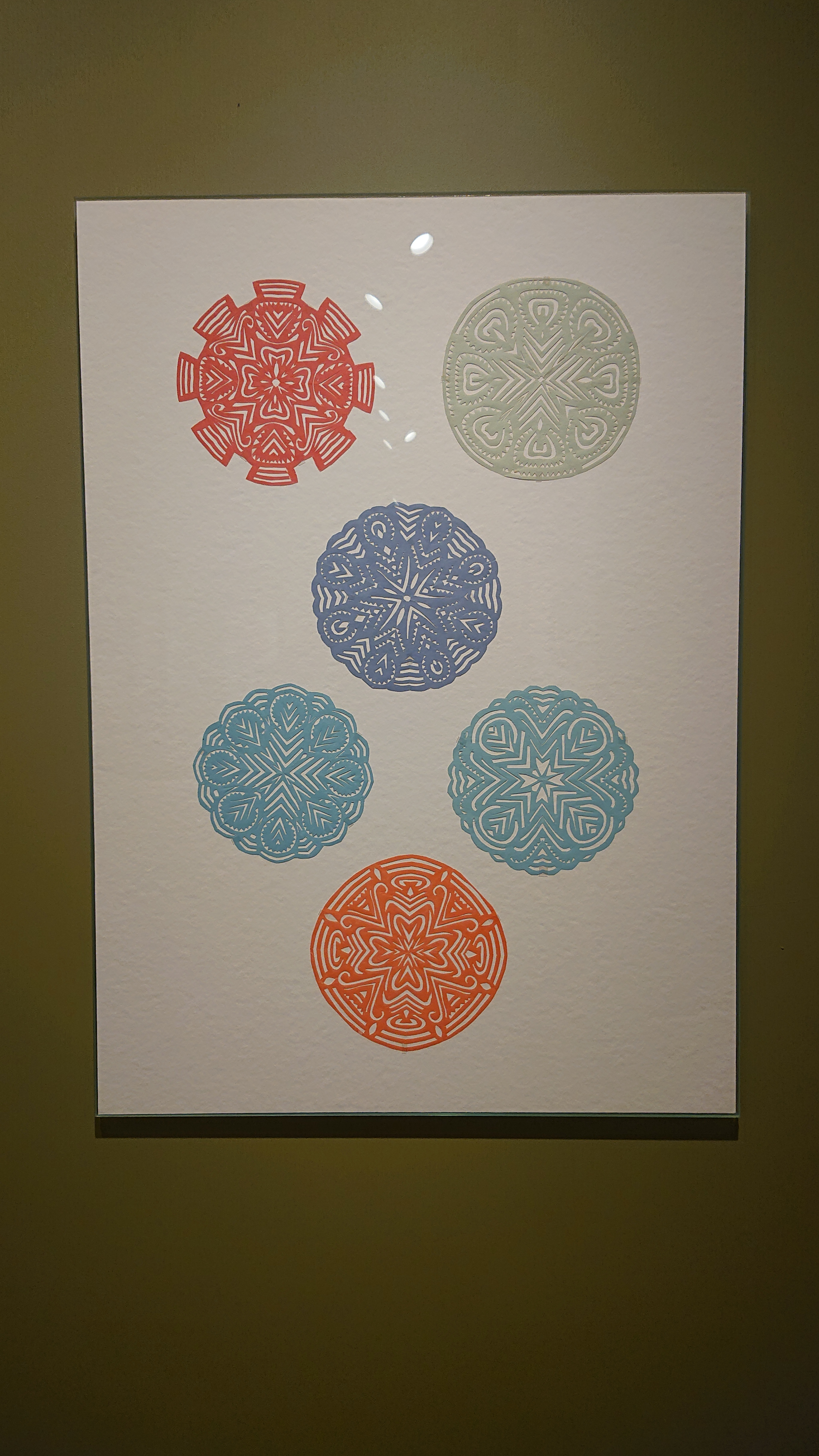
Paper cutouts by Małgorzata Wultańska from Obryte, Museum of Kurpie Culture in Ostrołęka

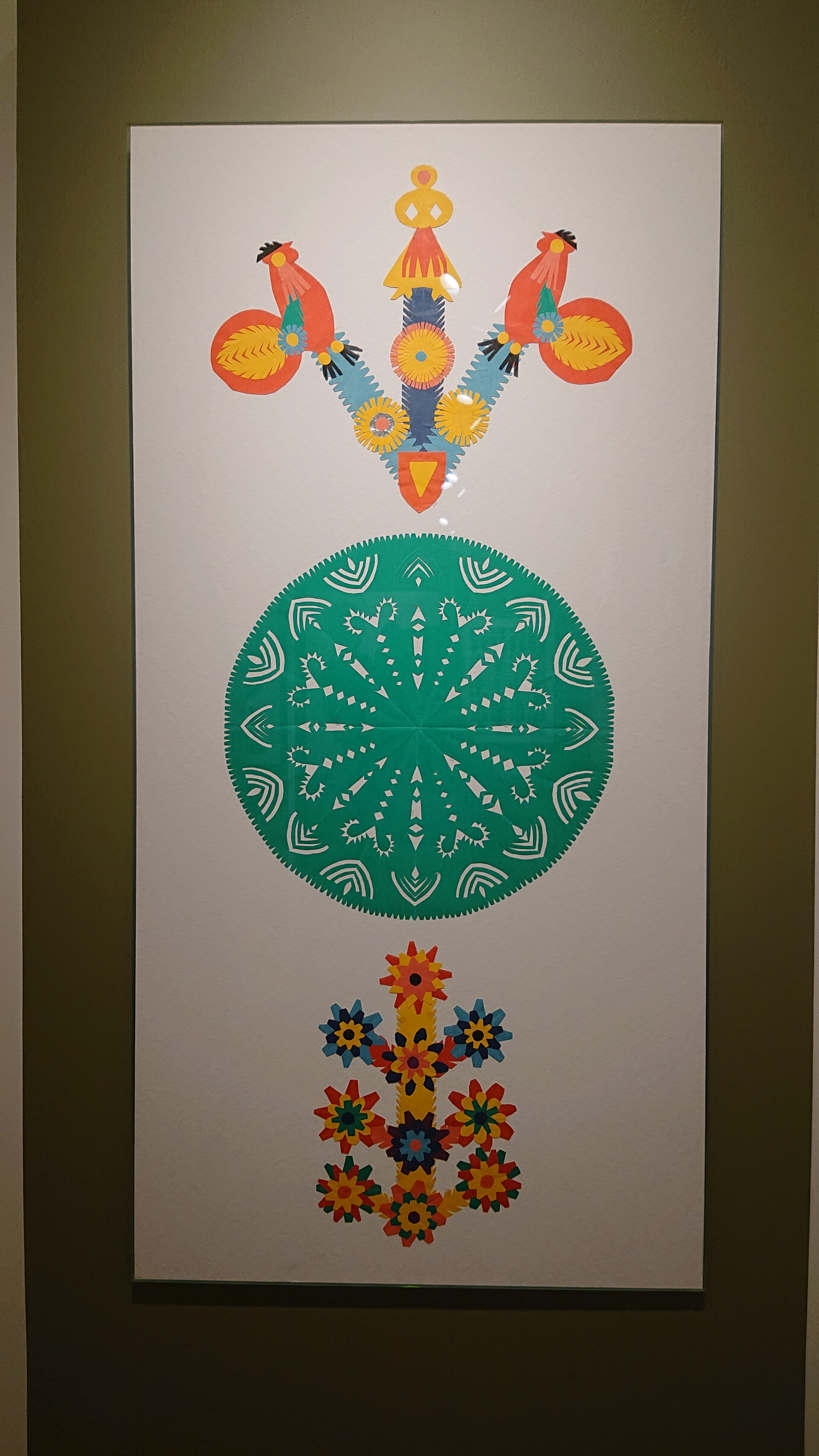
Paper cutouts by Stefania Woźnica from Rząśnik, Museum of Kurpie Culture in Ostrołęka

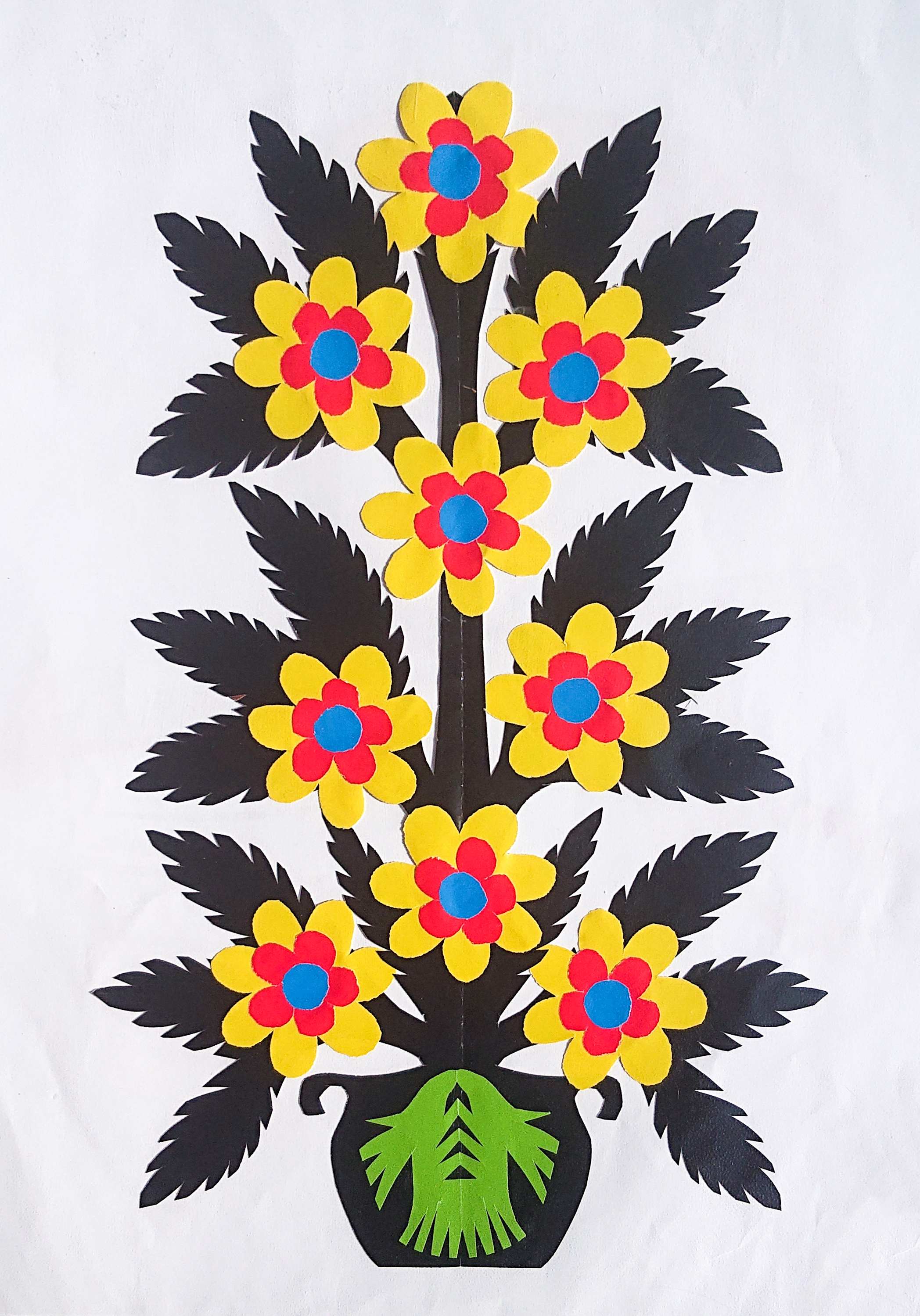
Lilies (leluje) made by Emilia Fornalska, collection of the Kuźnia Kurpiowska cultural center in Pniewo

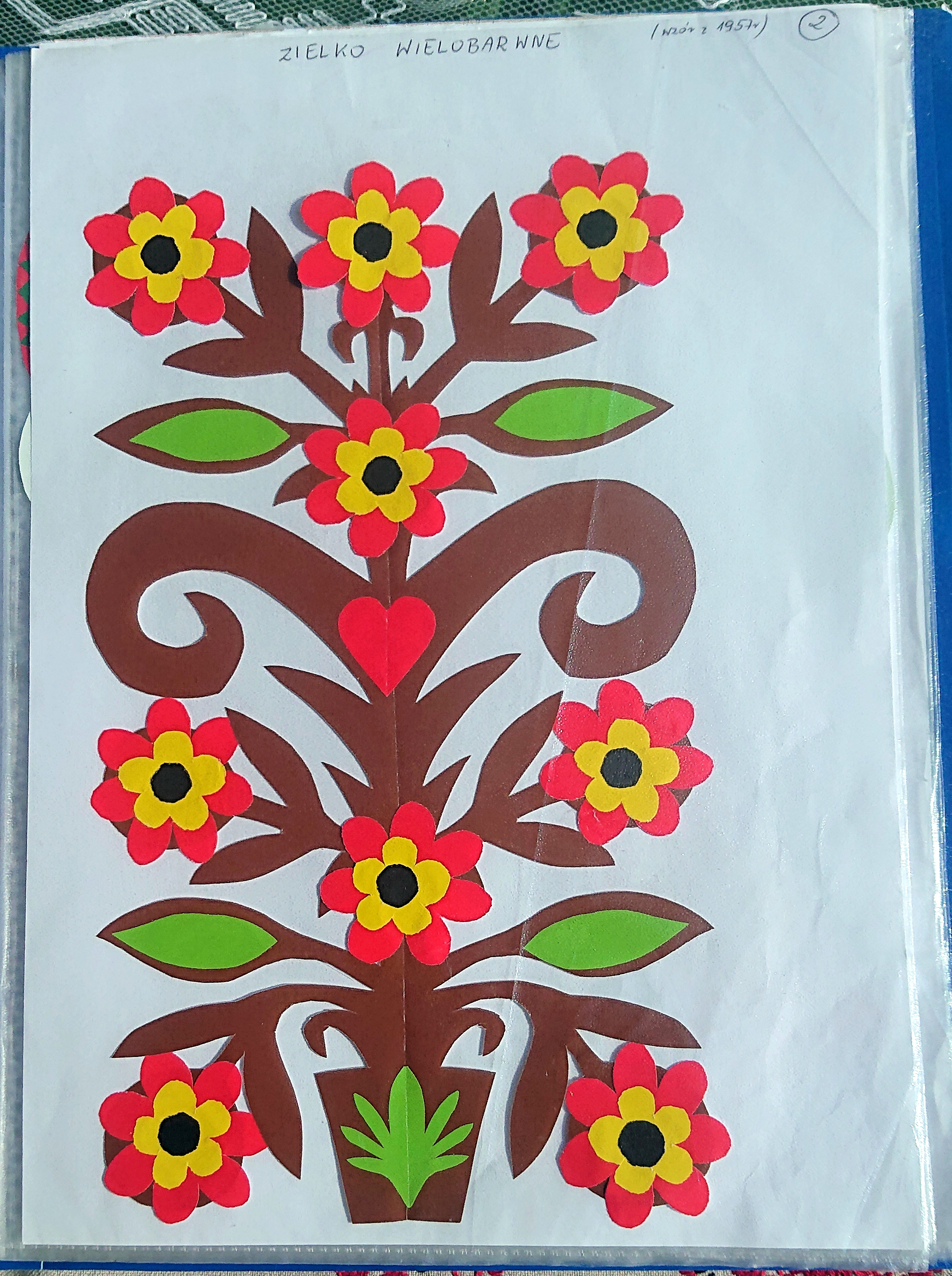
Multicoloured zielko made by Emilia Fornalska, collection of the Kuźnia Kurpiowska cultural center in Pniewo

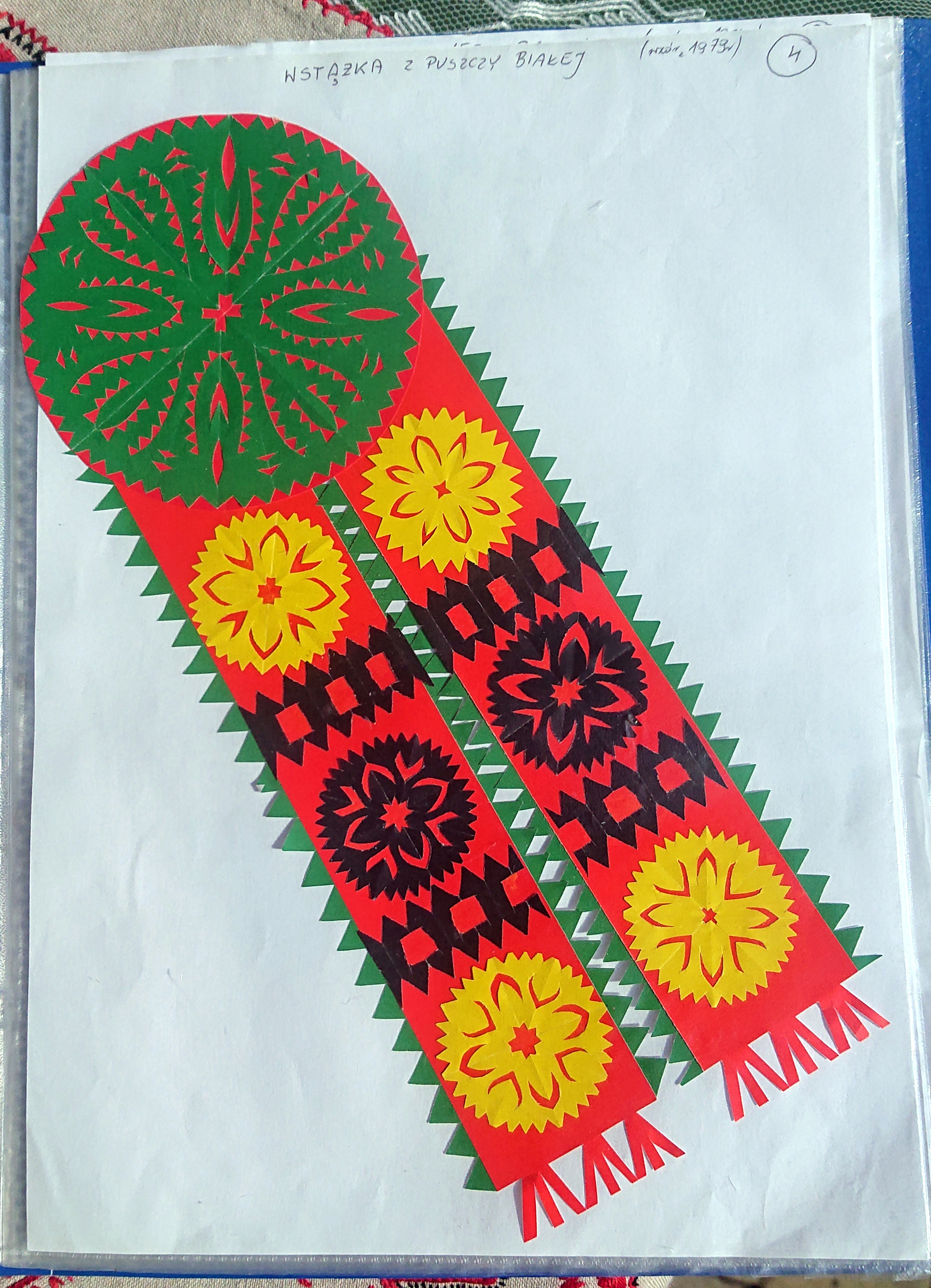
Wstęga (ribbon) made by Emilia Fornalska, collection of the Kuźnia Kurpiowska cultural center in Pniewo

== Wycinanka from Puszcza Zielona ==
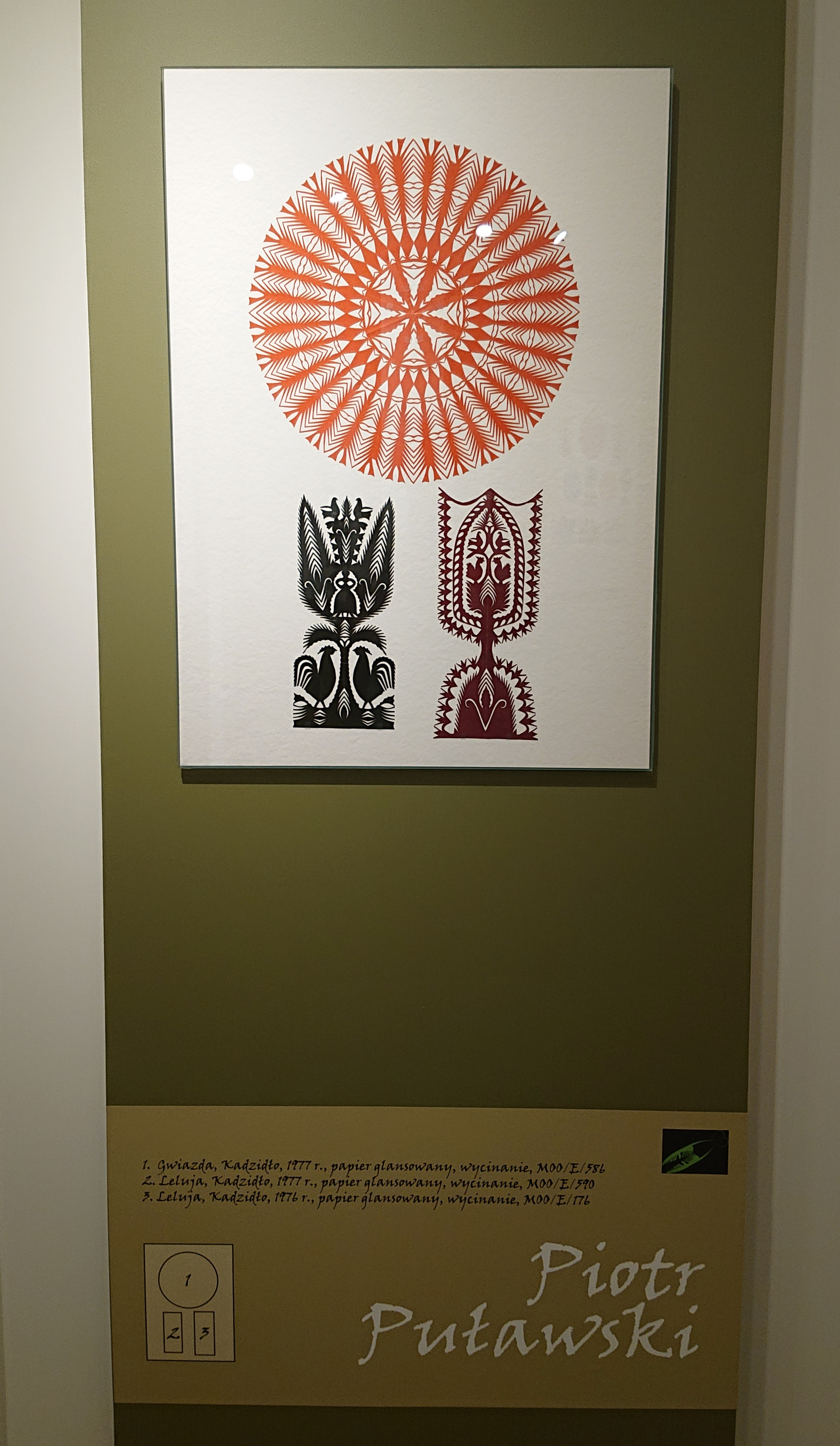
Board of paper cutouts by Piotr Puławski, exhibition Wycinanka kurpiowska at the Museum of Kurpie Culture in Ostrołęka

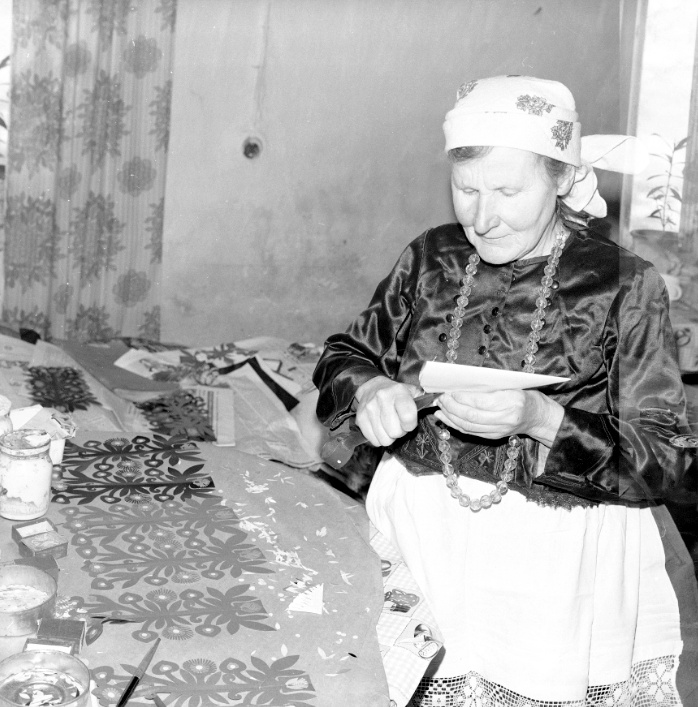
Stanisława Olender, a paper cutting artist from Puszcza Zielona

=== History ===
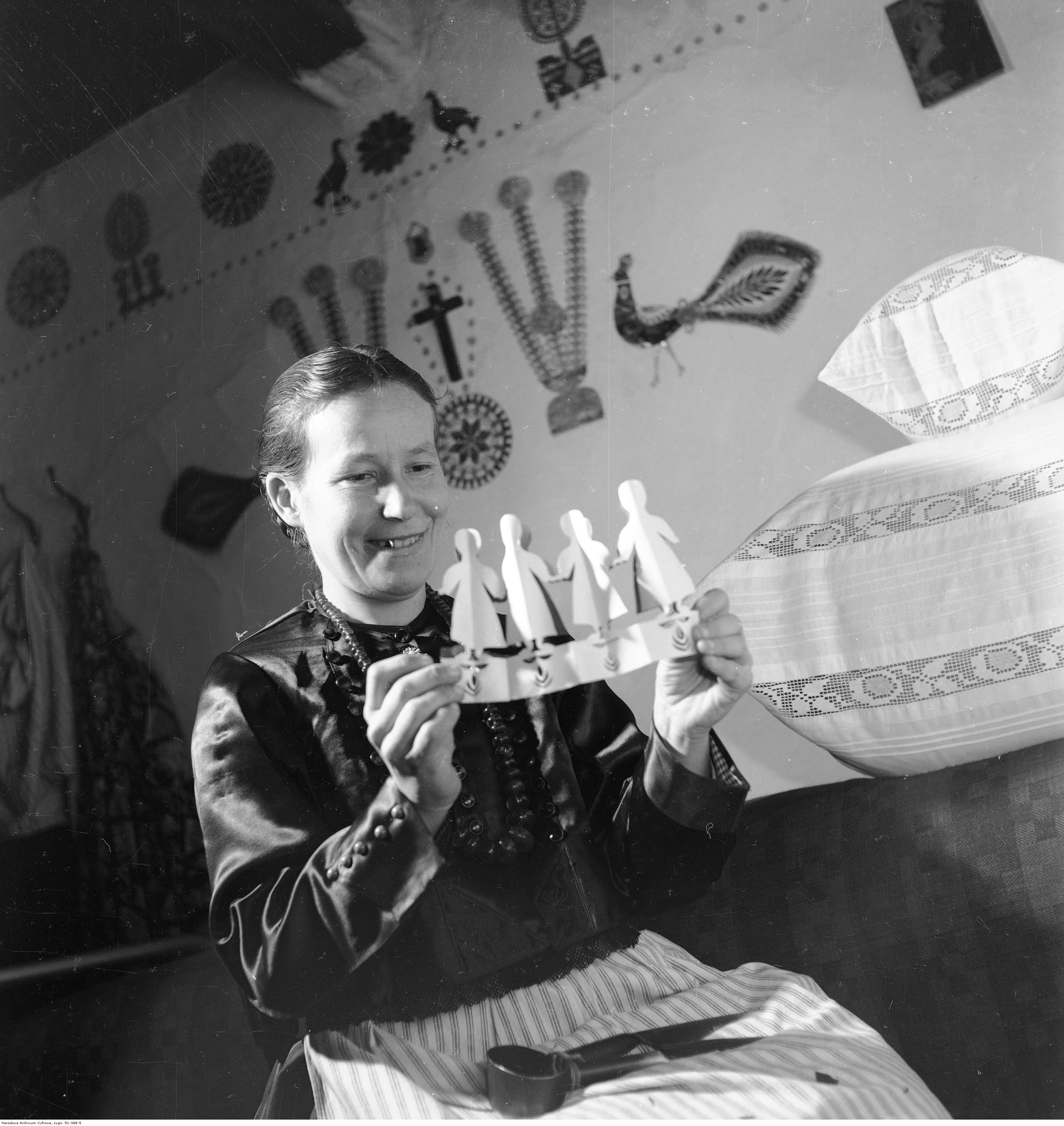
Czesława Konopka, a paper cutting artist from Puszcza Zielona

The origins of colorful paper cutouts in Puszcza Zielona are thought to date from the mid-19th century. The tradition first appeared in the vicinity of Kadzidło and Myszyniec, and later near Kolno. It began to disappear around 1930. Ethnographer Halina Olędzka suggested that the development of Kurpie paper cutouts was influenced by the presence of Jews in Puszcza Zielona, and that Jewish paper cutouts were similar to those of the Kurpie tradition.

Improved economic conditions in the 19th century, along with the availability of raw materials and models, allowed for the development of wooden construction in the Kurpie region of Puszcza Zielona. Since the 1860s, Kurpie houses were adorned with purely decorative elements. Women decorated the interiors of their homes with paper cutouts, among others, creating miniature works of art with sharp sheep shears and pieces of paper. Colorful cutouts, as well as white curtains made of paper or crêpe paper, were made by women of all ages, with the older ones often being teachers for the younger generations.

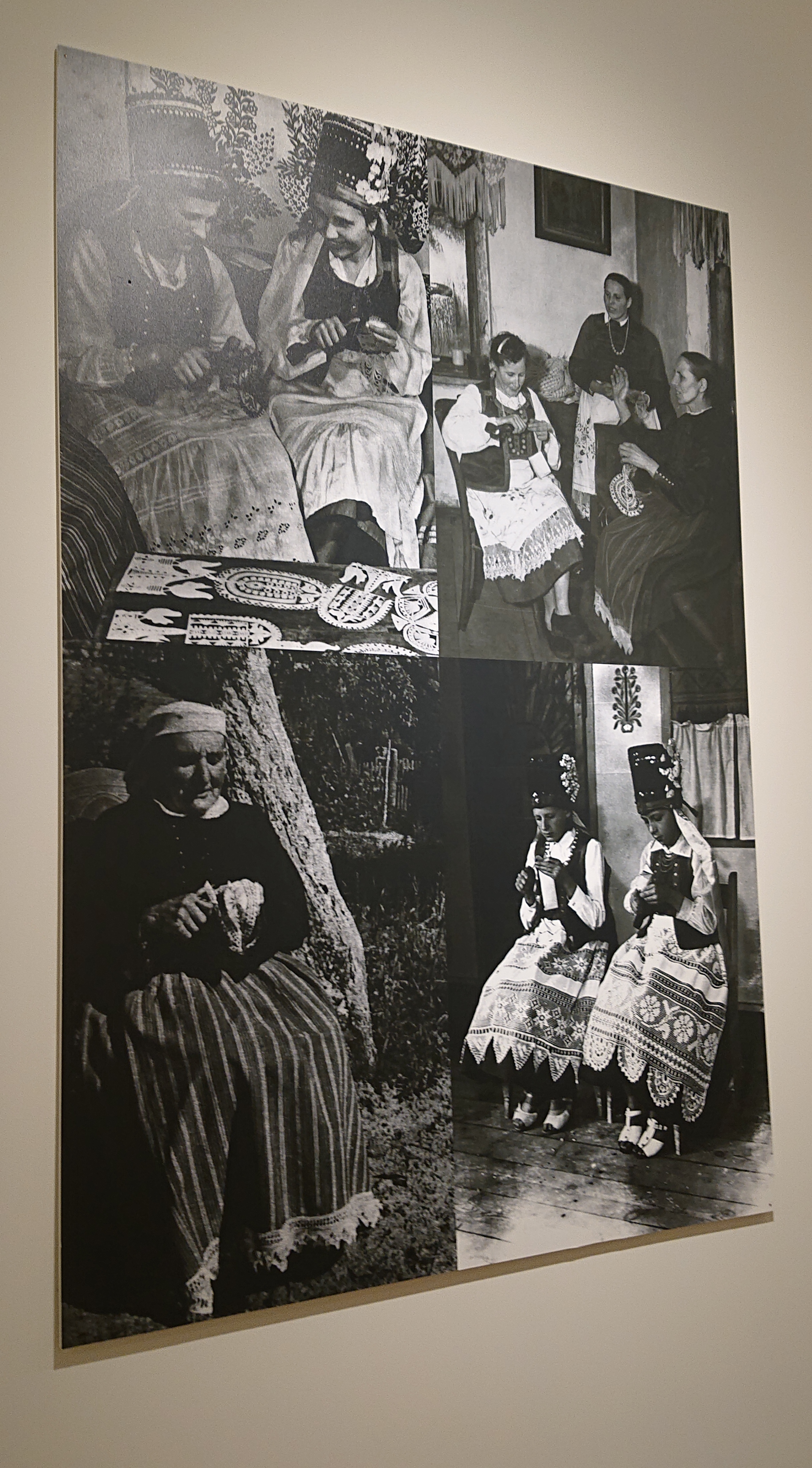
Paper cutting artists from Puszcza Zielona. Photographs from an exhibition at the Museum of Kurpie Culture in Ostrołęka

The first mentions of colorful Kurpie paper cutouts date back to the 1880s. Wiktor Czajewski described curtains cut out of paper, while the July 1886 issue of Wisła magazine reported that Kurpie women cut out "various figures of horses, dragons, flowers, and bizarre animals from colored paper, which they then stuck on the walls of their cottages next to pictures to decorate their main rooms". Colorful glossy paper, produced at the paper mill in Jeziorna, appeared in the countryside thanks to travelling traders, which influenced the development of paper cutting. Although this material reached other regions as well, the art developed epecially among the Kurpie people, where women became masters of paper cutting. Colorful cutouts stuck on the walls of the main room created decorative strips that contrasted with the white walls and drew attention. The decoration of cottages with paper cutouts began to disappear in the 1920s, but was revived after World War II as a result of a competition and exhibition held in Kadzidło in 1948, followed by the activities of the Cepelia cooperative. New forms of paper cutouts appeared in the 1960s, when human figures began to be incorporated into the traditional star shape, one of the forms of the art. Another new form was the so-called las (forest) – a large, rectangular, single-color thematic cutout.

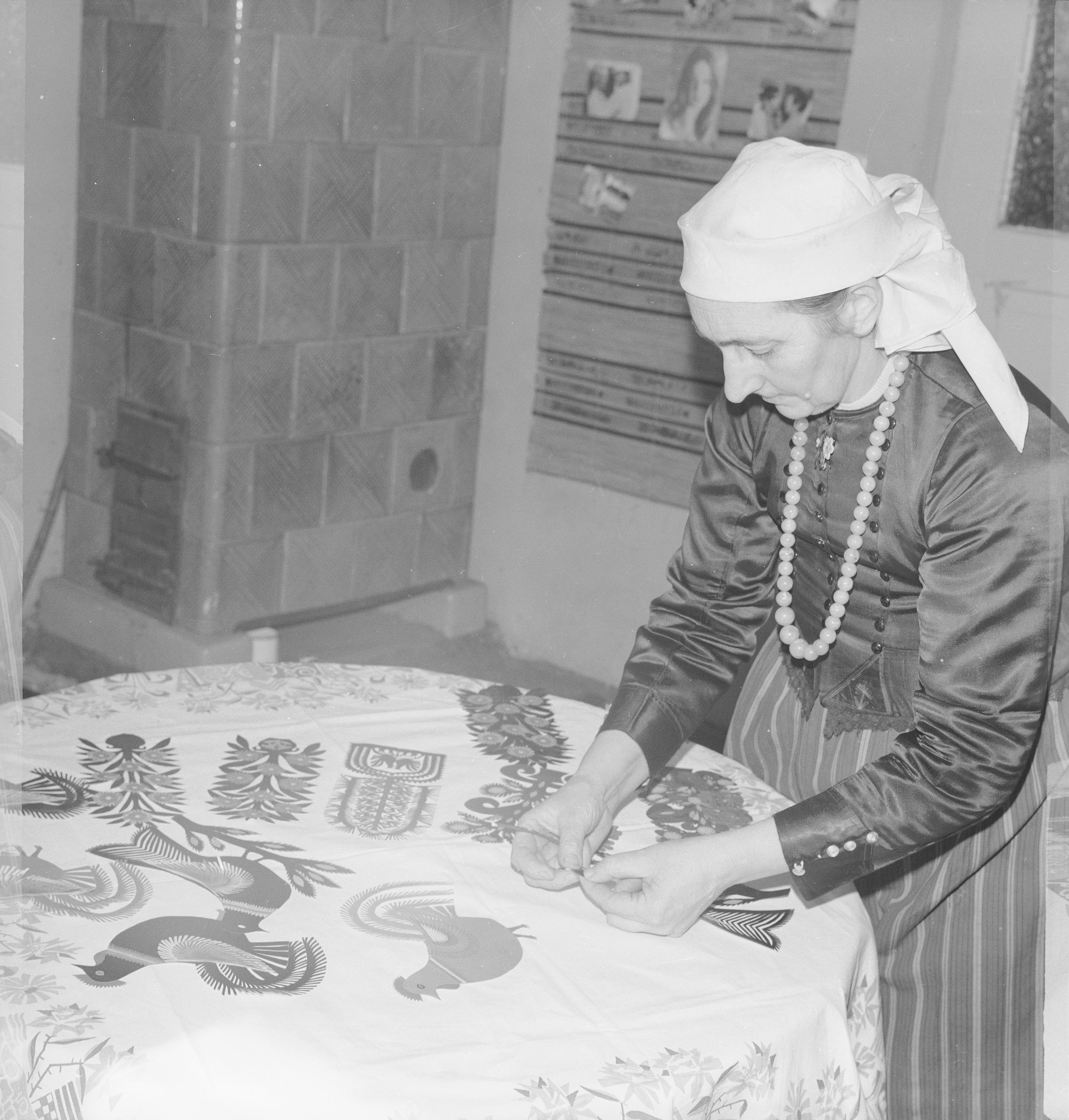
Stanisława Bakuła, a paper cutting artist from Puszcza Zielona

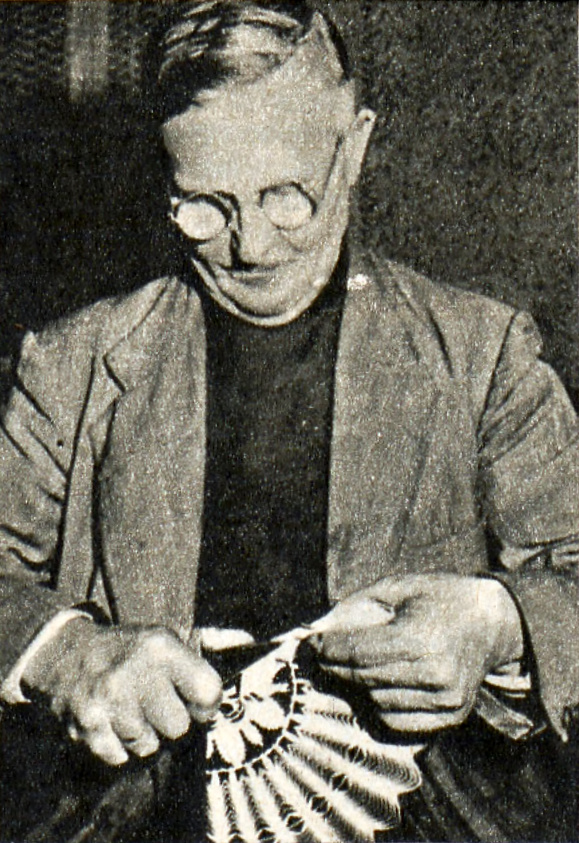
Piotr Puławski from Kadzidło, a paper cutting artist from Puszcza Zielona

Ribbons and decoratively cut crêpe paper used to cover damaged pictures, mirror frames or crucifixes, observed in Polish villages in the first half of the 19th century, likely preceded colorful cutouts. Initially, housewives attached white paper cutouts to the eaves in the kitchen. Then came crêpe paper or paper curtains, which preceded the actual cutouts. Curtains were shaped like two triangles, which were stuck in pairs in the upper corners of the window frame. Another form was a wide rectangular strip cut into patterns and placed along the upper window frame. At first, simple geometric shapes were used – rhombuses, triangles, serrated edges, and herringbone patterns – while later designs introduced semicircles, as well as anthropomorphic and zoomorphic motifs, such as birds and forest animals. These decorations were changed twice a year, before Christmas and Easter, after whitewashing and cleaning of the cottage.

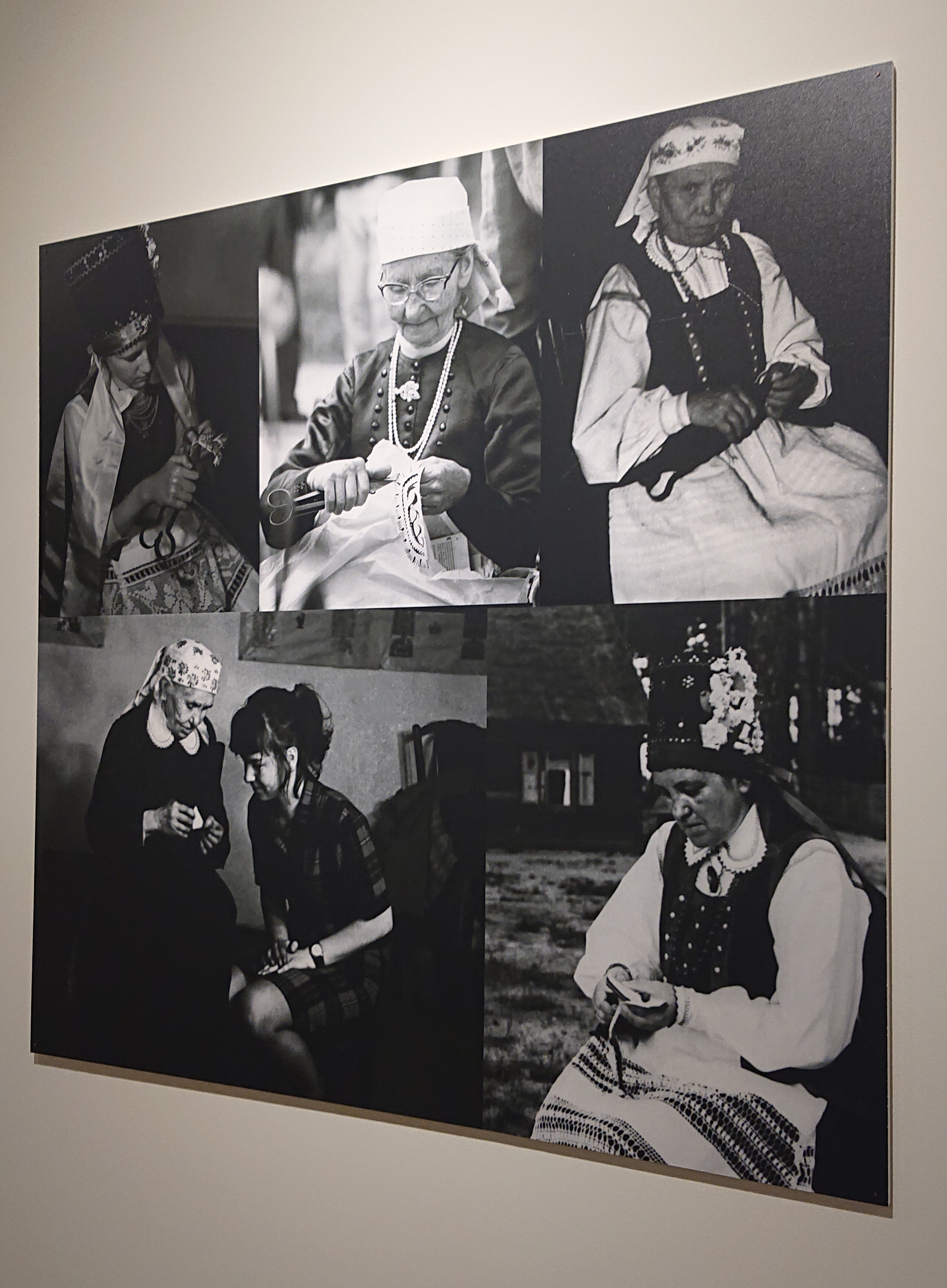
Paper cutting artists from Puszcza Zielona. Photographs from an exhibition at the Museum of Kurpie Culture in Ostrołęka

One of the two classic forms of paper cutouts characteristic of Puszcza Zielona is the leluja (lily) – a symmetrical, vertical, two-part composition. The lower, smaller part forms the base, while the upper part is an elaborate crown, which can be closed or open and is often topped by an element marking the axis of symmetry, such as a cross. There are two types of lelujas: Myszyniec (thickly cut, with geometric patterns and a grid of rhomboidal and triangular meshes) and Kadzidło (finely cut, with plant, zoomorphic, and anthropomorphic elements). Early lelujas were created in the form of three branches coming out of a vase, often decorated with pasted pieces of paper. Over time, new patterns developed, and different regional variations appeared – for example, in the vicinity of Kolno, lelujas were usually cut in pairs and had frayed edges. Today, this form is referenced in the cutouts created by artists from the Łyse area. In the past, lelujas had simple stylized plant or geometric motifs, occasionally including human figures, while in present times, elaborate and finely cut plant and animal motifs dominate. Older Kadzidło-type lelujas had two ornaments in the crown; today there are more.

Another form, noticeable since the beginning of the 20th century, is the three-part leluja known as hostyja (sacramental bread), which resembles a monstrance. It appeared throughout the entire Puszcza Zielona and had sacred motifs such as angels, burning hearts, and candles, with a cross crowning the cutout and marking the axis of symmetry. Today, this form has been forgotten.

The second type of cutouts characteristic of Puszcza Zielona are stars known as kółka (circles). In the past, they were made by layering several sheets of paper in contrasting colors and adding a white border cut into an openwork pattern. The dominant design was a grid radiating from the center with rhombus, triangle, post, and herringbone motifs. Such cutouts were placed on the unbleached side walls of the ceiling beams. Over time, the white stars were replaced by versions made of colored paper: the openwork cutting extended across the entire surface, and the colorful decoration in the center was abandoned, while in single-color cutouts, this element was replaced by a rectangular piece of tin foil. Later, stars with 16 or 32 rays and a fine openwork ornament appeared, becoming progressively smaller and more precise. Contemporary Myszyniec-style stars have triangular and rhomboidal grid patterns and herringbone motifs, while Kadzidło-style forms are more ornate, using cut herringbone, feather-line patterns, and plant or zoomorphic ornaments. Some motifs were created in specific families and were passed down across generations. In the 1980s, thematic elements appeared in the center of the stars, including figures of the Pope, the Virgin Mary, and Kurpie couples, as well as commemorative motifs for events such as baptisms, weddings, and anniversaries.

There are also multicolored silhouette cutouts depicting animals or genre scenes. This type of Kurpie Zielone cutout had pairs of birds (mainly roosters and peacocks) facing each other. In the past, roosters on a ladder were pasted above the entrance to the main room, while peacocks in profile with tails decorated with many layers of paper in contrasting colors were displayed on the walls. Images of multicolored hoopoes and horses with riders, created using the collage technique, became widespread. Such forms appeared among the Kurpie people in the mid-20th century, coinciding with growing interest in the tradition outside the region and the decline of cottage decoration with cutouts. Generic compositions often resemble painted pictures.

=== Notable paper cutting artists from Puszcza Zielona ===
- Stefania Samsel and Waleria Brodzik from Myszyniec-Browar;
- Stefania Chorążewicz and Bronisława Samsel from Myszyniec Stary;
- Stanisława Niedźwiedzka from Baba;
- Władysława Staśkiewicz;
- Marianna Murzyn and Czesława Samsel from Zalesie;
- Czesława Kaczyńska and Rozalia Prusaczyk from Dylewo;
- Anna Ropiak from Myszyniec Stary and her sons Lucjan, Krzysztof, and Stanisław;
- Franciszka Kowalczyk from Wykrot;
- Marianna Pac from Pełty;
- Stanisława Bakuła, Stanisława Olender, Maria Ceberek, Henryka Olender, Stanisława Staśkiewicz, Cecylia Staśkiewicz, Wincenty Staśkiewicz, and Stanisława Dawid from Strzałki;
- Zofia Samul from Dęby.

=== Gallery ===
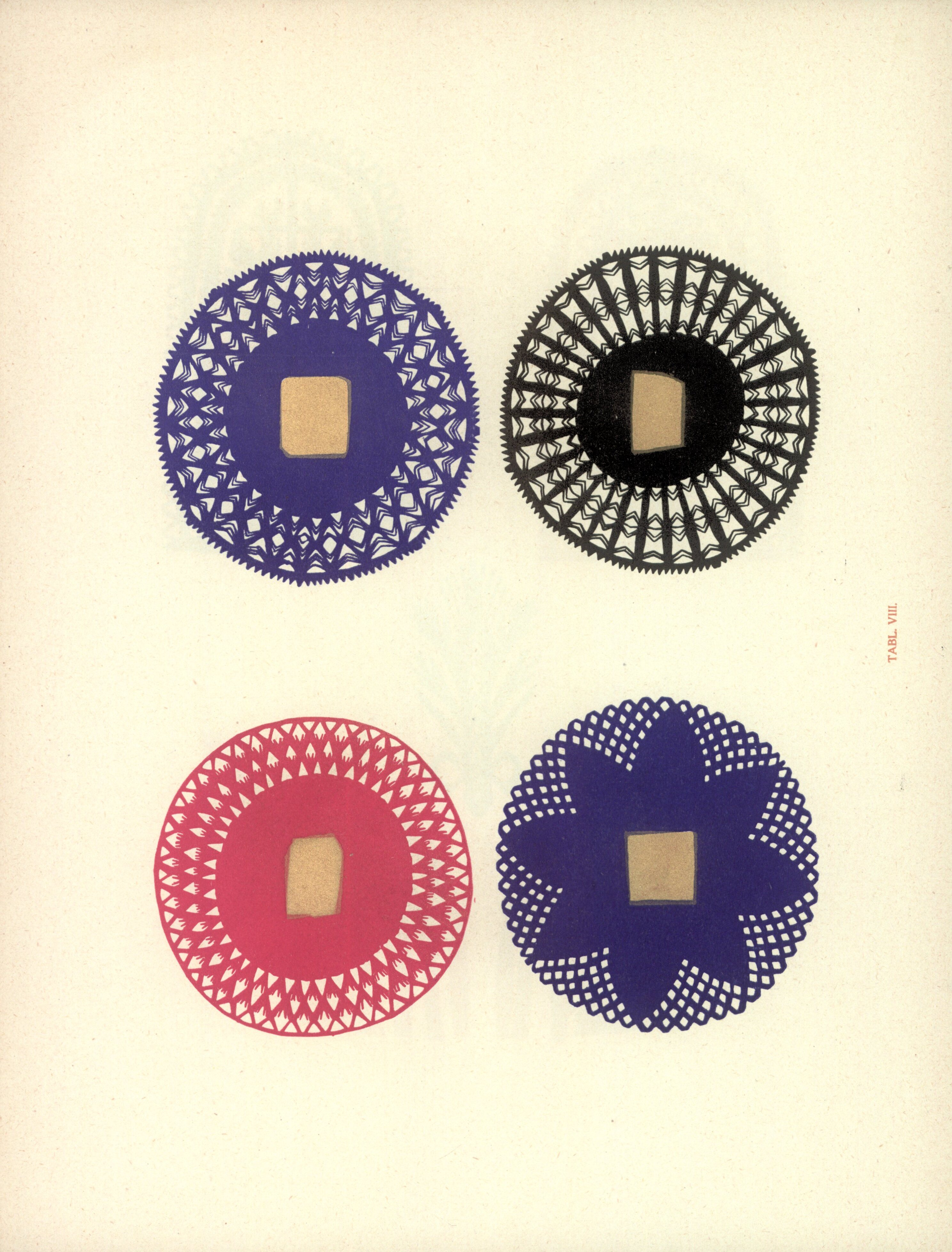
Some of the earliest known star forms from Puszcza Zielona

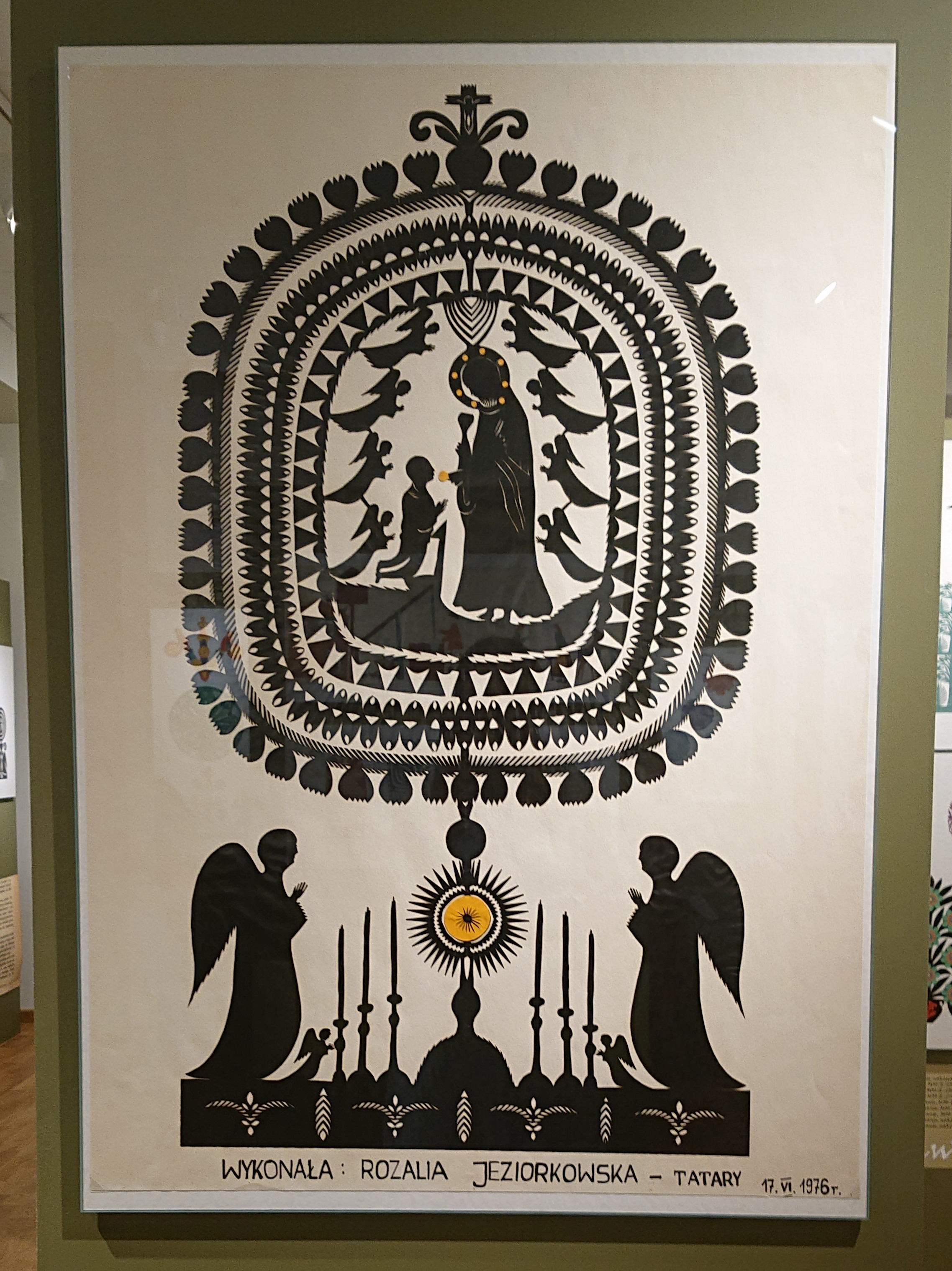
Monstrance-type cutout by Rozalia Jeziorkowska, Museum of Kurpie Culture in Ostrołęka

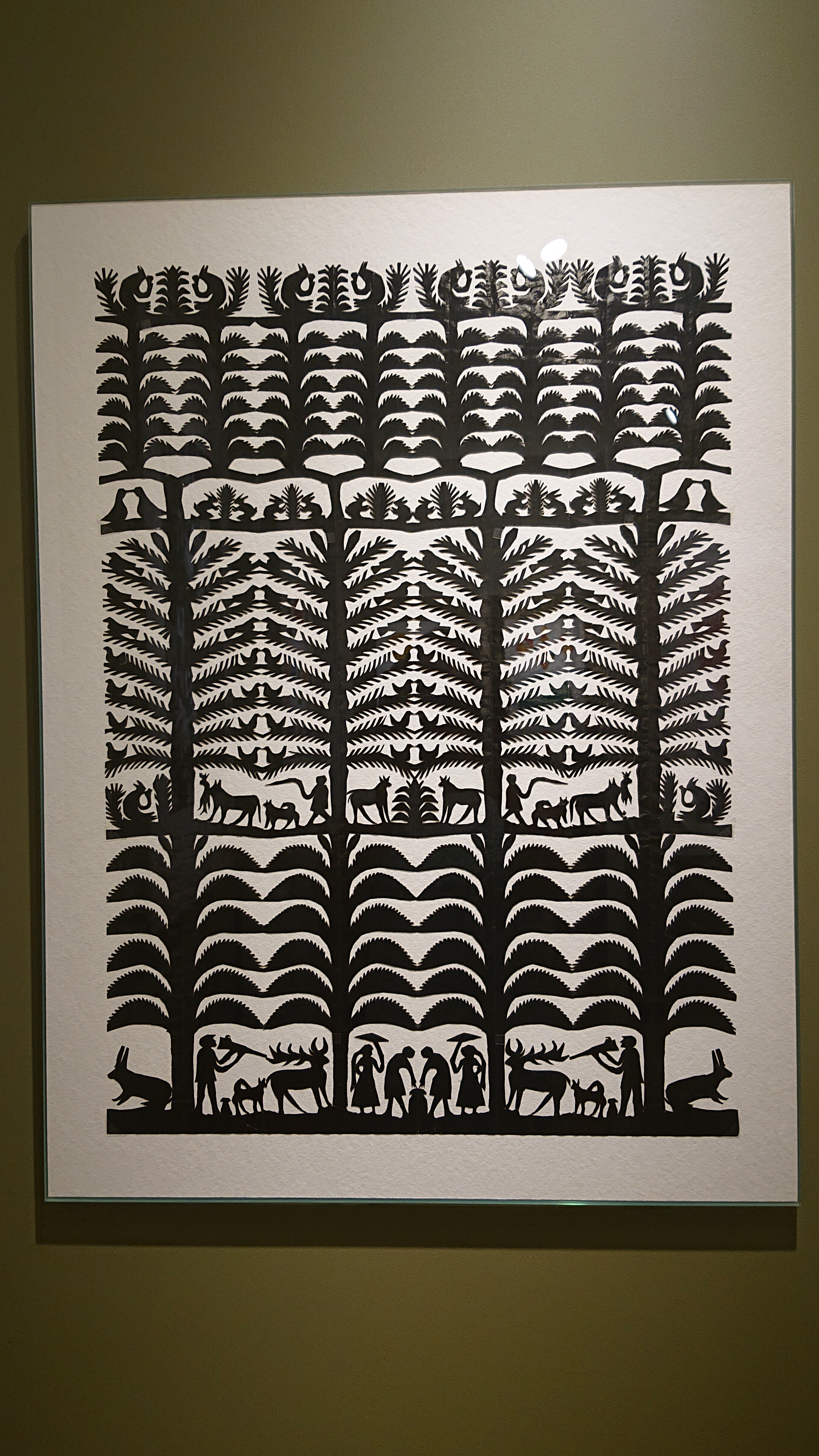
Forest-type cutout by Marianna Bałdyga, Museum of Kurpie Culture in Ostrołęka

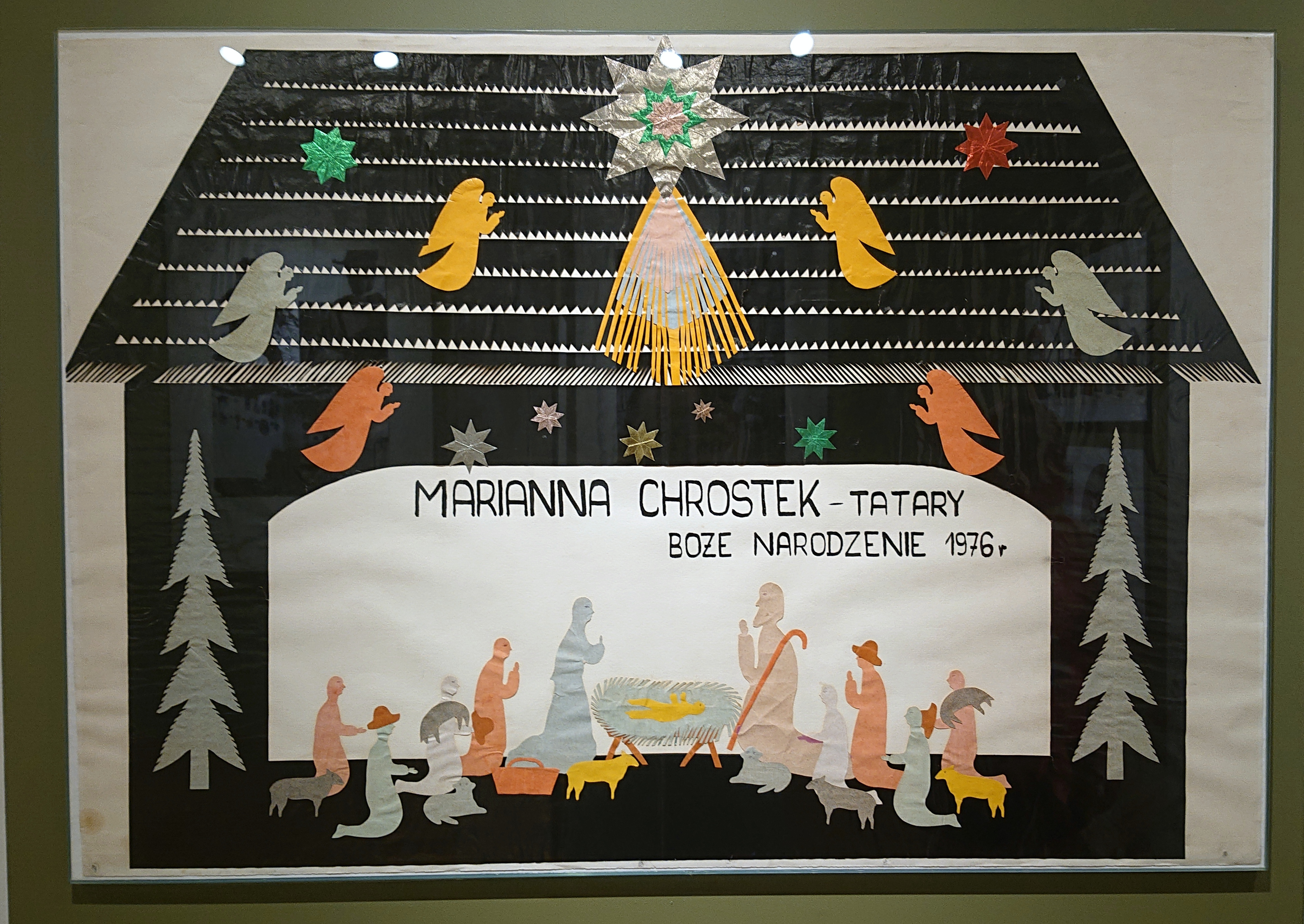
Cutout by Maria Chrostek, Museum of Kurpie Culture in Ostrołęka

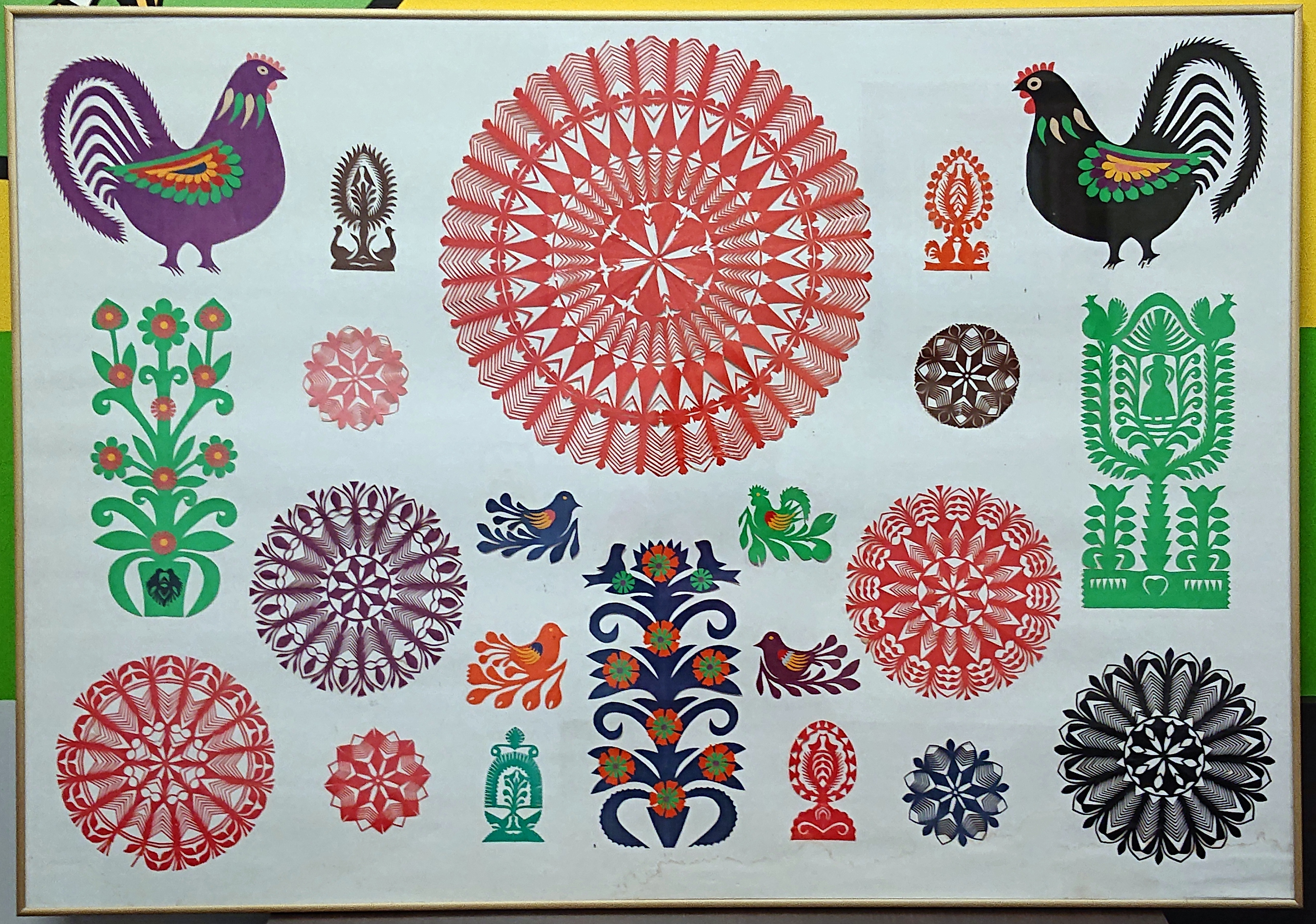
Set of cutouts from Puszcza Zielona made in Kadzidło in 1985

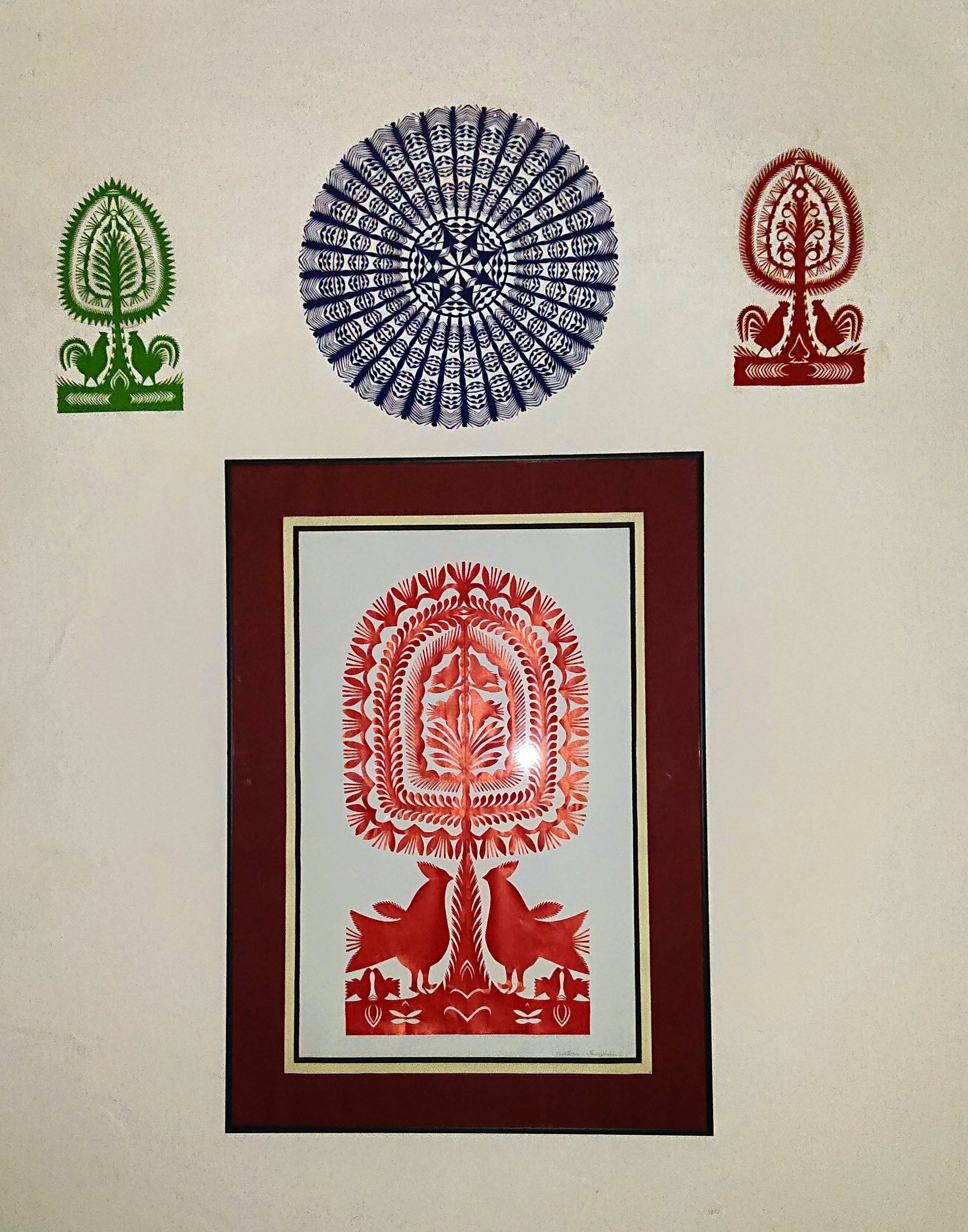
Cutouts by Halina Pajka (leluja and stars at top) and Czesława Kaczyńska (leluja in frame)

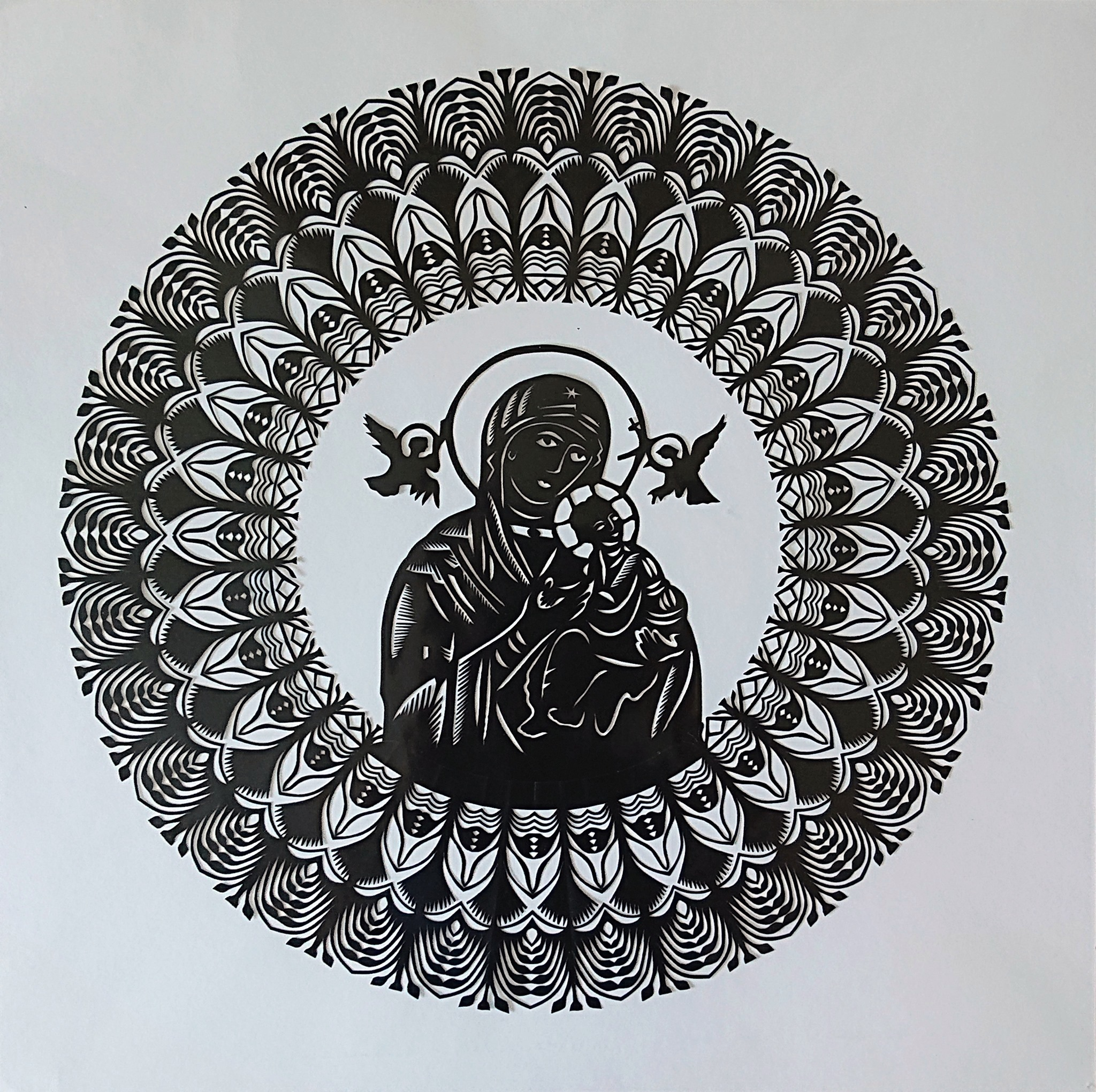
Star cutout by Wiesława Bogdańska

== Uses ==
=== Postcards ===
In 1910, the B. Wierzbicki Photochemical Studio published postcards with designs of Kurpie paper cutouts from Przasnysz County, based on works collected at the National Museum of Ethnography in Warsaw. Witold Jurgielewicz and Tadeusz Pruszkowski, artists associated with the School of Fine Arts in Warsaw, designed a series of postcards inspired by Kurpie and Łowicz paper cutouts after viewing the collections of the Polish Applied Arts Society in 1905.

In the 1930s, the Polish Tourist and Sightseeing Society released a series of postcards with Kurpie paper cutouts by artists including Piotr Puławski, Stanisława Konopka, Stanisława Bakuła, Stanisława Staśkiewicz, Marianna Pac, Anna Kordecka, Stefania Chorążewicz, Maria Ceberek, and Czesława Konopka.

After World War II, paper cutouts from Puszcza Biała and Puszcza Zielona appeared on ordinary postcards and Christmas cards. In the 1960s, the Polish Tourist and Sightseeing Society published postcards with cutouts by Katarzyna Rudnicka from Puszcza Biała.

Today, competitions are organized for postcards with motifs of Kurpie cutouts from Puszcza Zielona and Puszcza Biała. The organizers include the local government of Gmina Kadzidło, the Mieczysław Mieszko Kurpie Culture Center in Kadzidło, the Kurpie Association, and the Municipal Center of Culture and Art in Pułtusk.

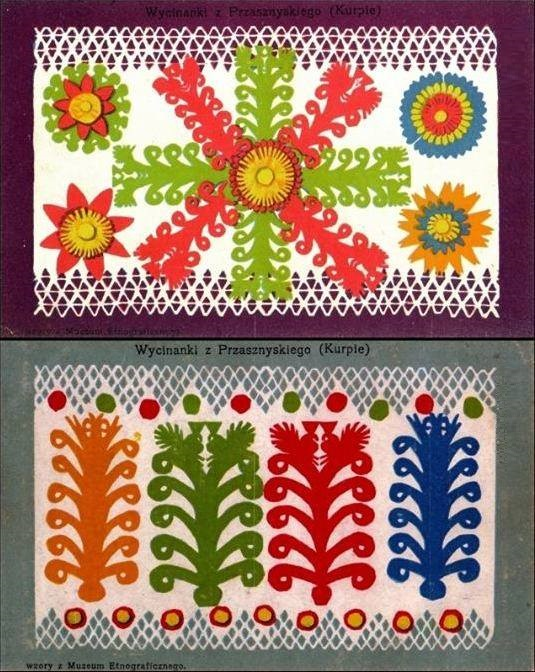
Postcards with Kurpie cutouts from Przasnysz County, published by the B. Wierzbicki Photochemical Studio, 1910

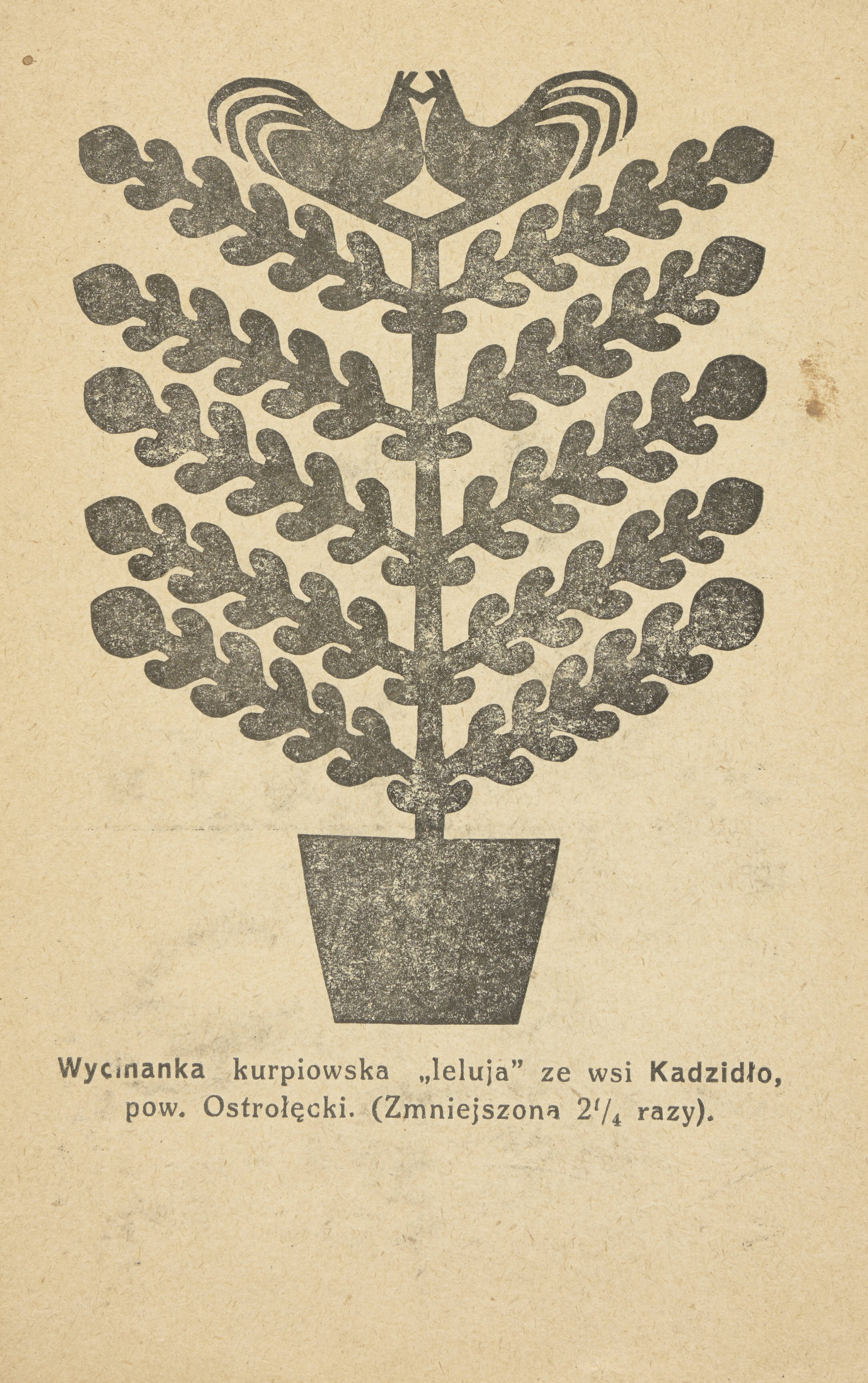
Postcard with a leluja from Kadzidło, published in Nowogród by the Kurpie Branch of the Polish Tourist and Sightseeing Society (1930–1933)

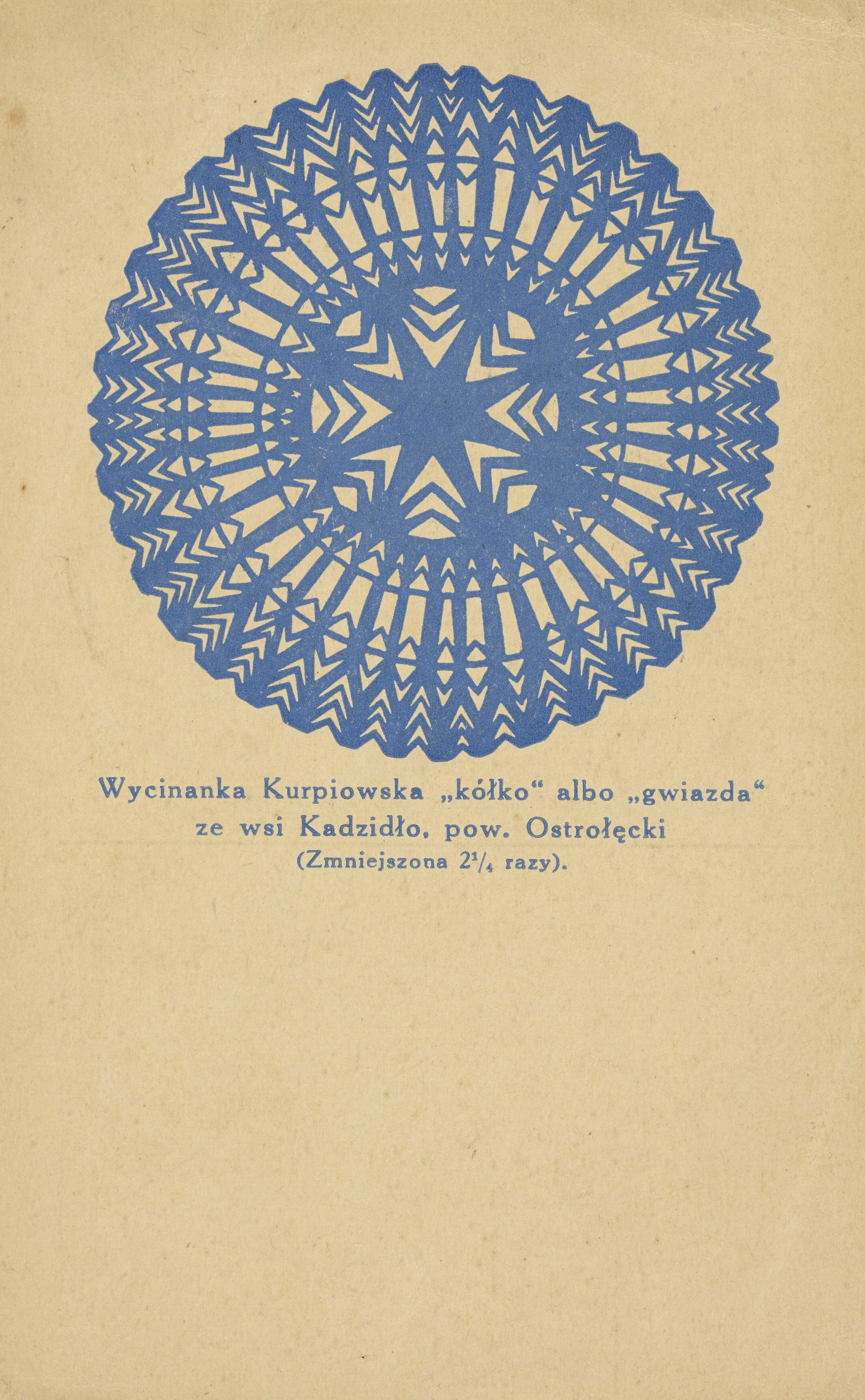
Postcard with a star from Kadzidło, published in Nowogród by the Kurpie Branch of the Polish Tourist and Sightseeing Society (1933)

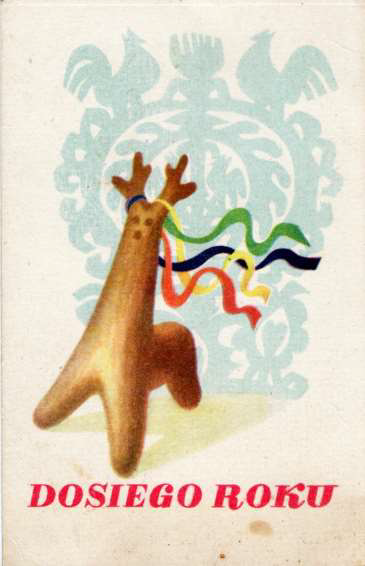
New Year's postcard with a byśek and a Kurpie cutout from Puszcza Zielona, 1951

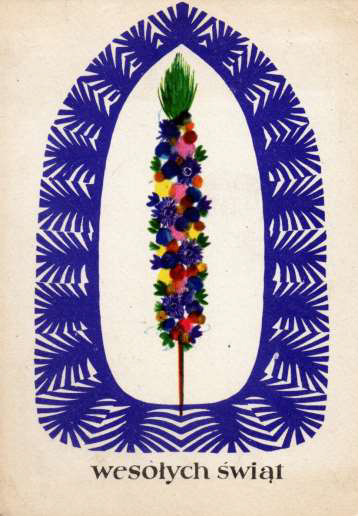
Easter postcard with a Kurpie cutout and a palm from Puszcza Zielona, 1967

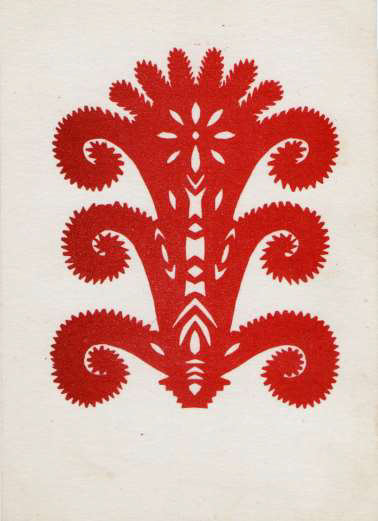
Postcard with a zielko cutout made by Katarzyna Rudnicka from Puszcza Biała, 1960s

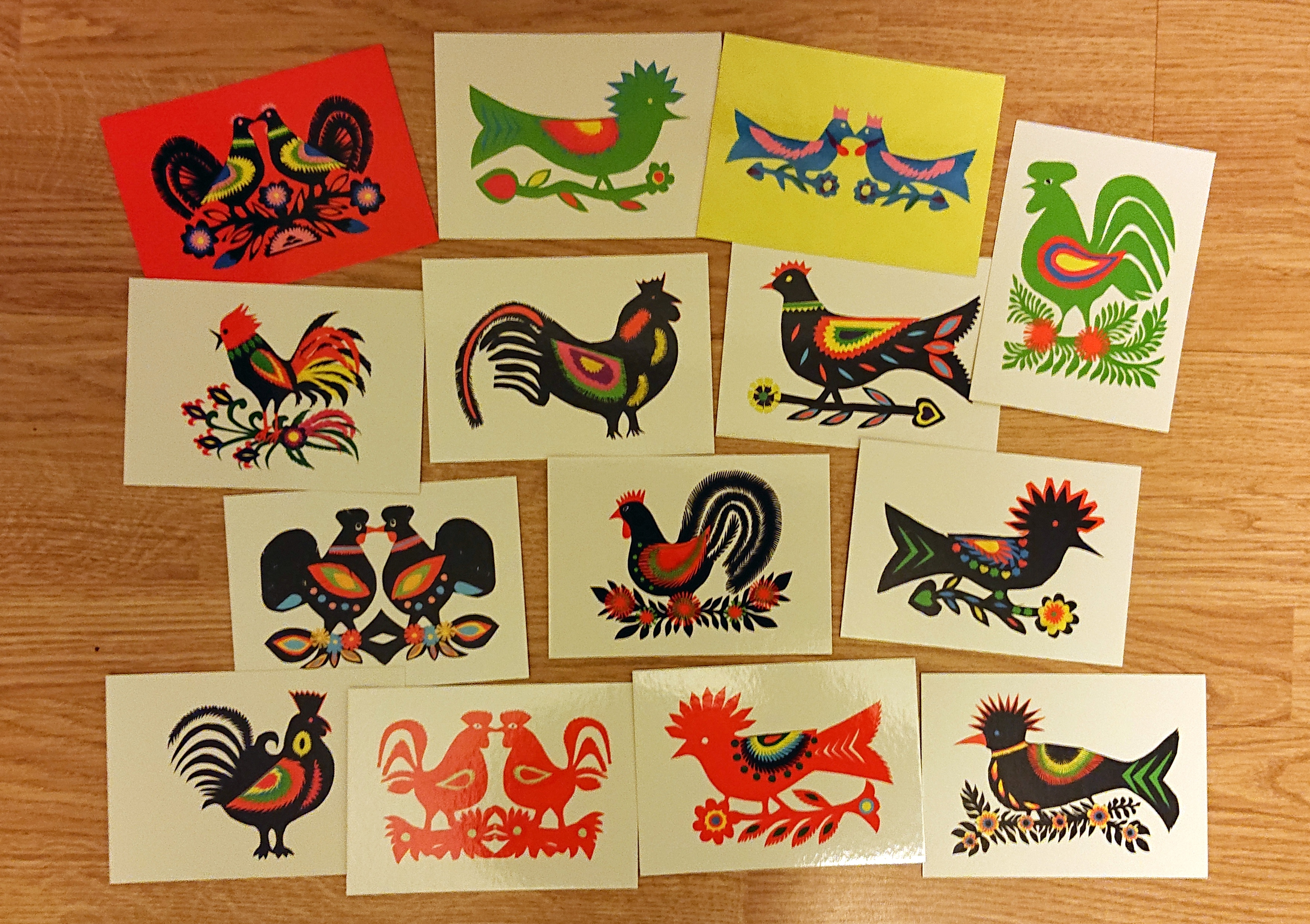
Postcards published by the Gmina Kadzidło Office, with works by children and young people awarded in the "Kurpie Cutout" competition (2022)

=== Museum collections, competitions, and exhibitions ===
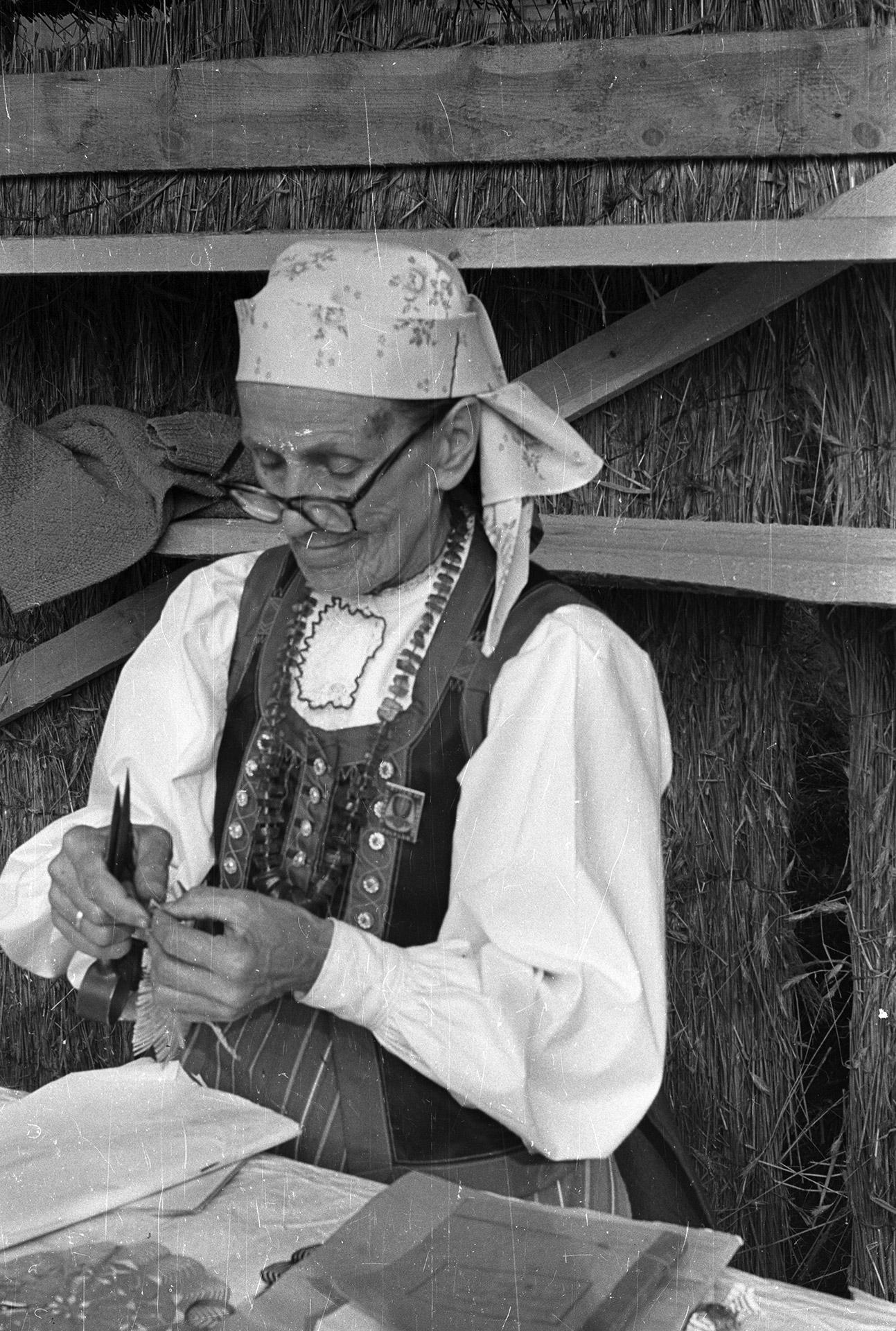
Rozalia Prusaczyk, a paper cutting artist from Puszcza Zielona, at the Folklore Fair in Bytów, 1974

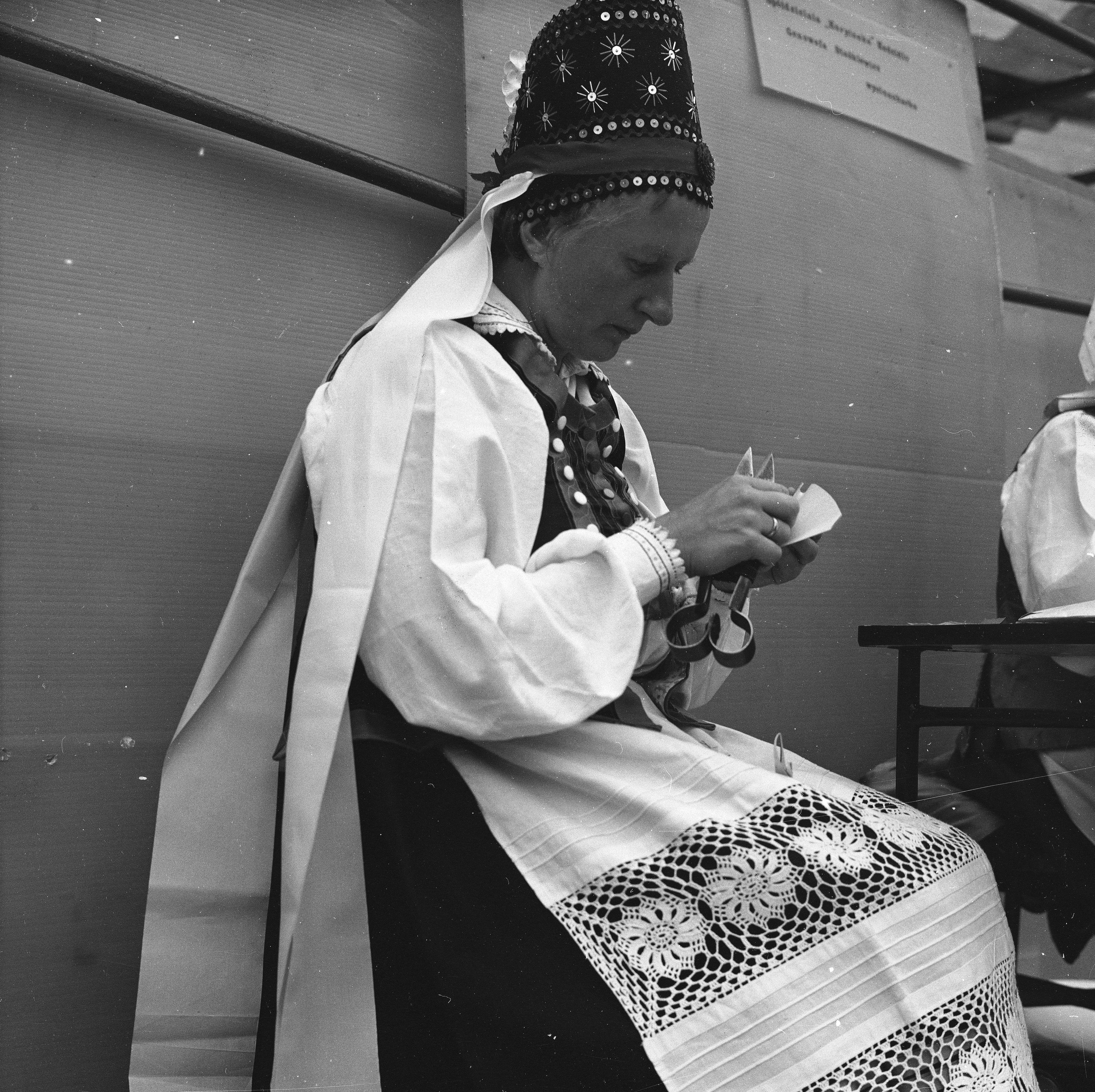
Stanisława Marchewka, a paper cutting artist from Puszcza Zielona, at the Trybuna Ludu Festival on Defilad Square in Warsaw, 1977

In 1902, an exhibition was held in the Kraków Cloth Hall and then in Warsaw's Zachęta gallery, where visitors could view, among other things, paper cutouts from Puszcza Zielona and Puszcza Biała. Between 1902 and 1903, members of the Polish Applied Arts Society assembled a collection of Kurpie cutouts. In 1923, Seweryn Udziela published a catalog of Kurpie and Łowicz paper cutouts from the society's collection. In 1967, they were transferred from the Jan Matejko Academy of Fine Arts in Kraków to the Ethnographic Museum of Kraków.

Before World War I, the Museum of Industry and Agriculture in Warsaw collected Kurpie paper cutouts from Puszcza Zielona.

Before 1914 and during the interwar period, Karol Tchorek collected paper cutouts from Puszcza Zielona, especially from the Myszyniec area, although his first collections came from Puszcza Biała and included multicolored zielka as well as figural cutouts with dancing couples. At the end of the 1920s, Tchorek, as an envoy of the Representation of the Folk Industry Society, purchased paper cutouts in the Kurpie region for display at the Polish General Exhibition in Poznań (1929), where they were featured in one of the halls dedicated to Polish ethnography. in one of the rooms dedicated to Polish ethnography. In addition, scouts from the region, who were attending a two-week scout camp near Poznań in July 1929, built a model Kurpie village in which paper cutouts were affixed to the walls of the cottages. Scouts from Przasnysz placed Kurpie cutouts on the gate leading to the camp. The exhibition in Poznań was preceded by another opened on 4 July 1929 in Pułtusk, which was open for a month and presented the achievements of the Kurpie region and the Pułtusk part of Masovia. Among the exhibits were paper cutouts from Puszcza Biała and the Przasnysz part of Puszcza Zielona.

Before 1914, Jadwiga Wierniewicz from Obryte collected paper cutouts from Puszcza Biała and was awarded for her exhibits of Kurpie Białe cutouts at the Praca kobiet (Women's Work) exhibition in Kalisz. Adam Chętnik was also a collector of paper cutouts from Puszcza Zielona; his collection is housed in the North Masovian Museum in Łomża and consists of approximately 150 pre- and post-war paper cutouts from Puszcza Zielona, donated to the museum in 1994 by Chętnik's heirs. Father Władysław Skierkowski assembled over 200 paper cutouts, which are preserved in the Masovian Museum in Płock, whose Ethnography Department holds paper cutouts from both Puszcza Zielona and Biała.

In 1945, Karol Tchorek donated over 300 paper cutouts – mainly from Myszyniec and the surrounding area – to an exhibition which opened on 15 August 1945 at the Nike Art Salon at 63 Marszałkowska Street in Warsaw; it was the first exhibition held at the salon. In 2022, the Museum of Kurpie Culture received Tchorek's legacy as a deposit, comprising 322 paper cutouts from Puszcza Zielona and Puszcza Biała.

In 1948, the first post-World War II competition of Kurpie folk art took place in Kadzidło, organized by the Ministry of Culture and Art, inviting artists from Puszcza Zielona and Puszcza Biała. It contributed to the revival of paper cutting among the Kurpie people. In 1949, an exhibition titled Kurpiowska sztuka ludowa (Kurpie Folk Art) was presented in Pułtusk, with paper cutouts from Puszcza Zielona and Puszcza Biała.

Exhibitions showcasing Kurpie paper cutouts were held regularly, including in 1923 at the Zachęta gallery. In 1972, the District Committee of Culture and Art in Ostrołęka organized an exhibition entitled Współczesna sztuka ludowa Puszczy Zielonej (Contemporary Folk Art of Puszcza Zielona).

In the late 1940s and early 1950s, Aleksander Błachowski assembled a collection of paper cutouts from, among others, Puszcza Zielona and Puszcza Biała, which is now held in the Ethnographic Museum in Toruń. From between 1958 and 1959, Bernard Kielak began collecting paper cutouts from Puszcza Zielona. Since the 1980s, cutouts from Puszcza Zielona and Biała have been collected by Waldemar Krzyżewski, founder and co-owner of the Veterinary Museum in Przasnysz.

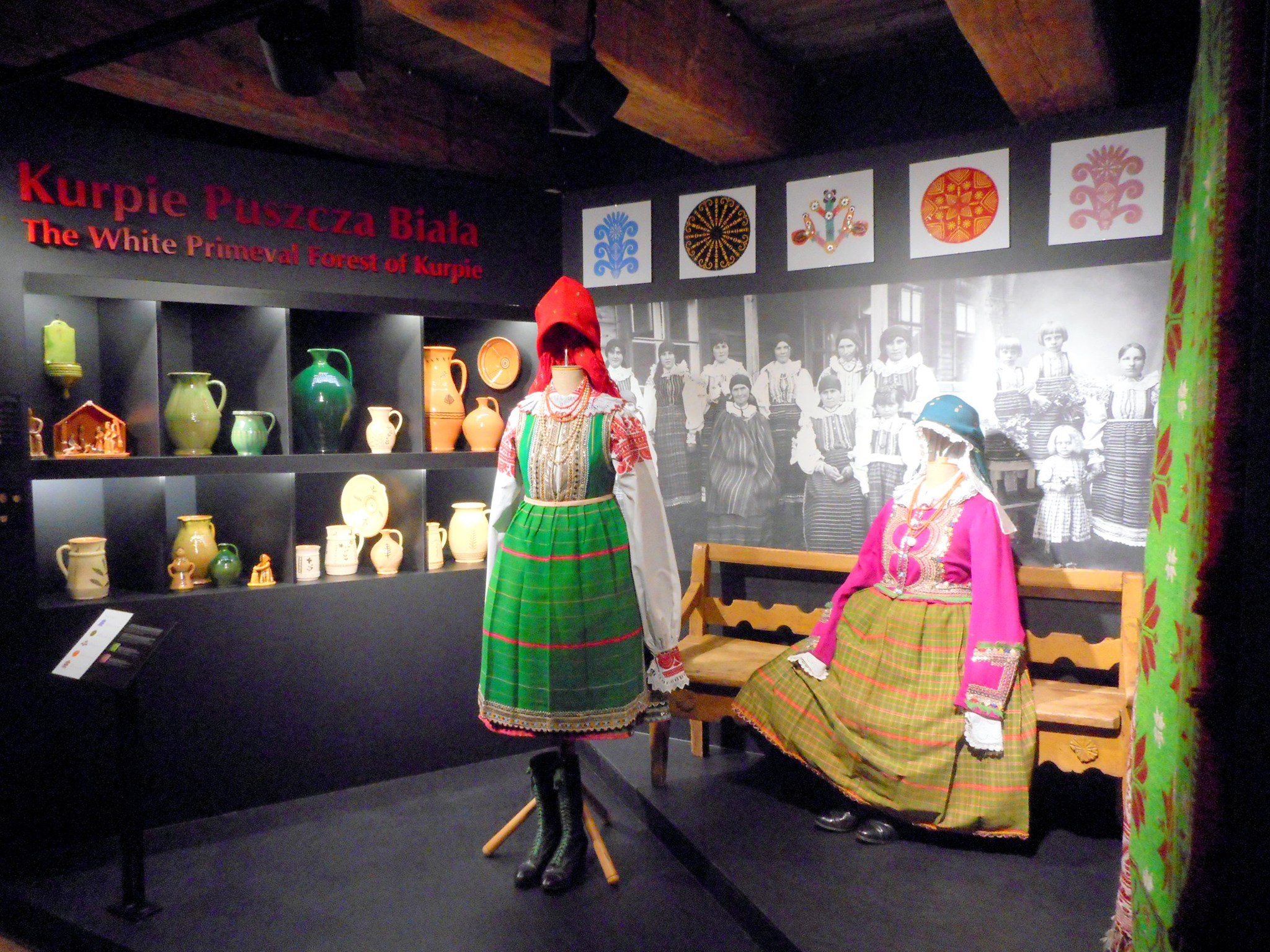
Kurpie Białe paper cutouts on display at the Masovian Museum in Płock

In the 1960s, Antoni Śledziewski, an instructor for folk art and folklore at the Cultural Department of the Warsaw Regional National Council, gathered 30 paper cutouts from Puszcza Zielona. Śledziewski first encountered Kurpie cutouts in 1955, when he brought back a dozen or so lelujas, stars, roosters, doves, and peacocks from Kadzidło and Myszyniec for his personal use. He organized an exhibition, which was shown for a year in cultural institutions throughout the Warsaw Voivodeship, presenting the works of Anna Kordecka, Rozalia Skrodzka, and Czesława Konopka. He continued to collect cutouts during competitions in which artists from Puszcza Zielona received awards and distinctions, often donating their works to the organizers. In 2003, Śledziewski established the Foundation for the Support of Folk Art, and in 2007, he contacted the local government of Konstancin-Jeziorna to commemorate the former paper mill and its role in the development of Polish paper cutouts. He donated his collection to the local government with the intention of creating a permanent gallery of Polish paper cutouts.

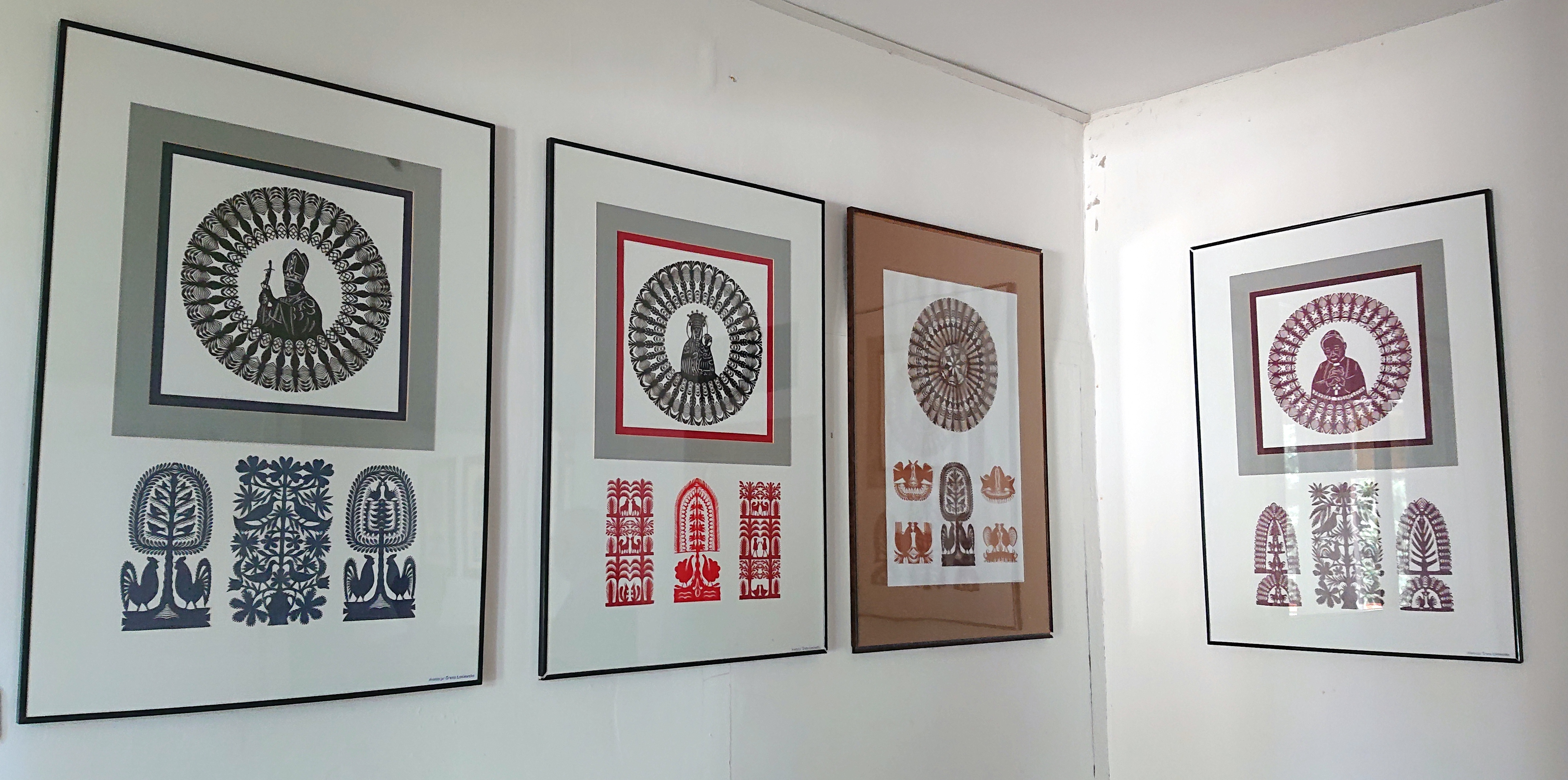
Paper cutouts by Irena Łoniewska in the museum of Brother Zenon Żebrowski (the Kurpie-Japanese Museum) in Czarnia

The Museum of Polish Paper Cutout, affiliated with the Konstancin Cultural Center, has a collection of paper cutouts from Puszcza Zielona and Puszcza Biała gathered by Śledziewski. The cutouts from Puszcza Biała are divided into two groups: the first includes works by Katarzyna Rudnicka, Anna Pudlis, Aleksandra Liwska, and Maria Świadkowska, received by Śledziewski from Father Czesław Rowicki of Długosiodło, who had been given them by the artists in 1952 and 1953. The second group contains cutouts from 1955 by Wiesława Archacka, Katarzyna Osowiecka, Teresa Włodarczyk, Genowefa Łada, and Władysława Kamińska. In total, the museum has 108 cutouts from Puszcza Biała. The collection also contains 221 cutouts made by artists from Puszcza Zielona: Anna Kordecka, Rozalia Skrodzka, Florentyna Śmietka, Władysława Warych, Stanisława Bakuła, Stanisława Olender, Henryka Olender, Anna Majewska, Antonina Kuliś, Stefania Konopka, Maria Chrostek, Rozalia Jeziorkowska, Czesława Konopka, Stanisława Staśkiewicz, Stanisława Dawid, Czesława Marchewka, Czesława Kaczyńska, Wiesława Bogdańska, Eugenia Pabich, Halina Pajka, and Piotr Puławski.

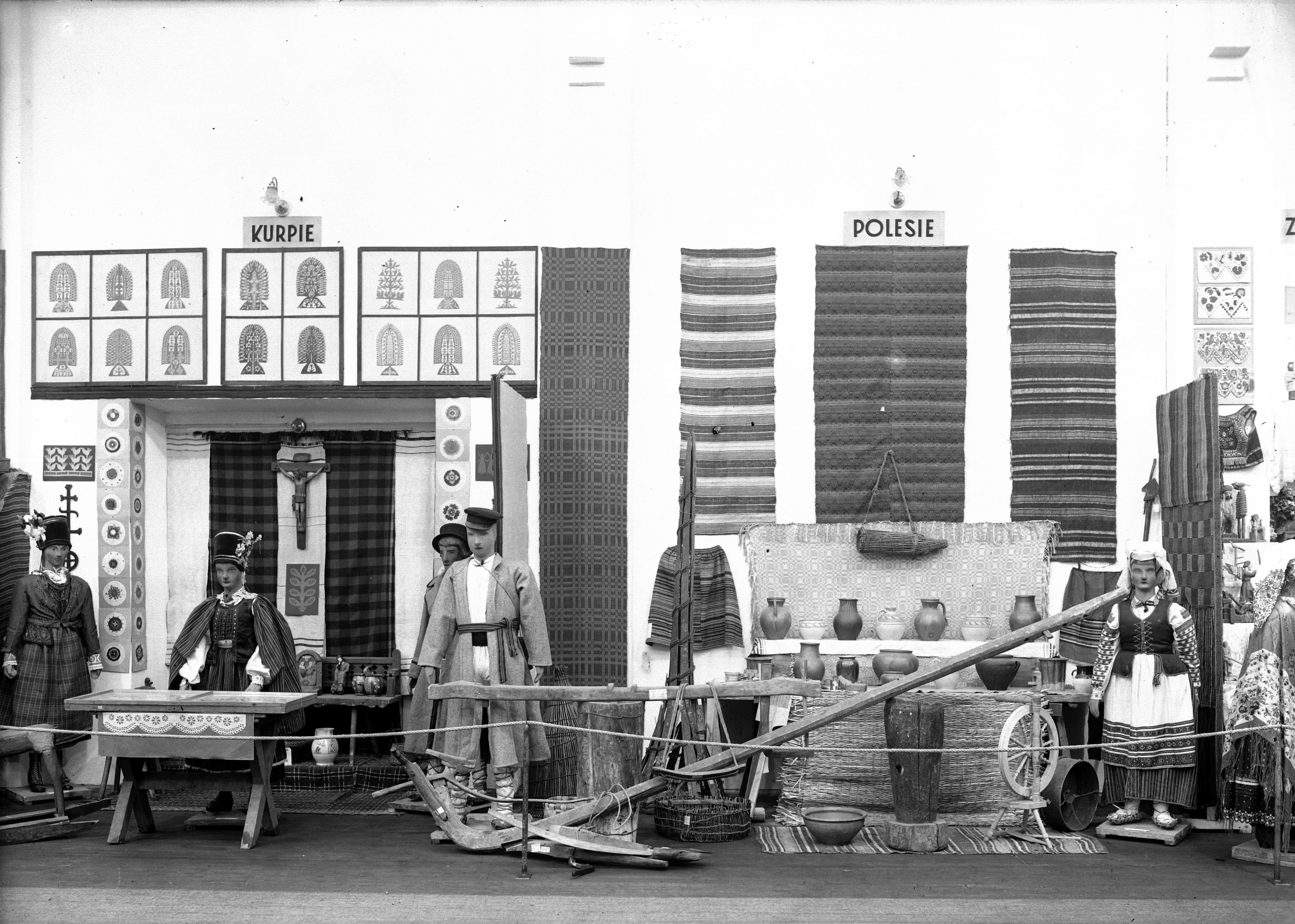
Ethnographic exhibition in Kraków (1931); Puszcza Zielona paper cutouts visible on the left

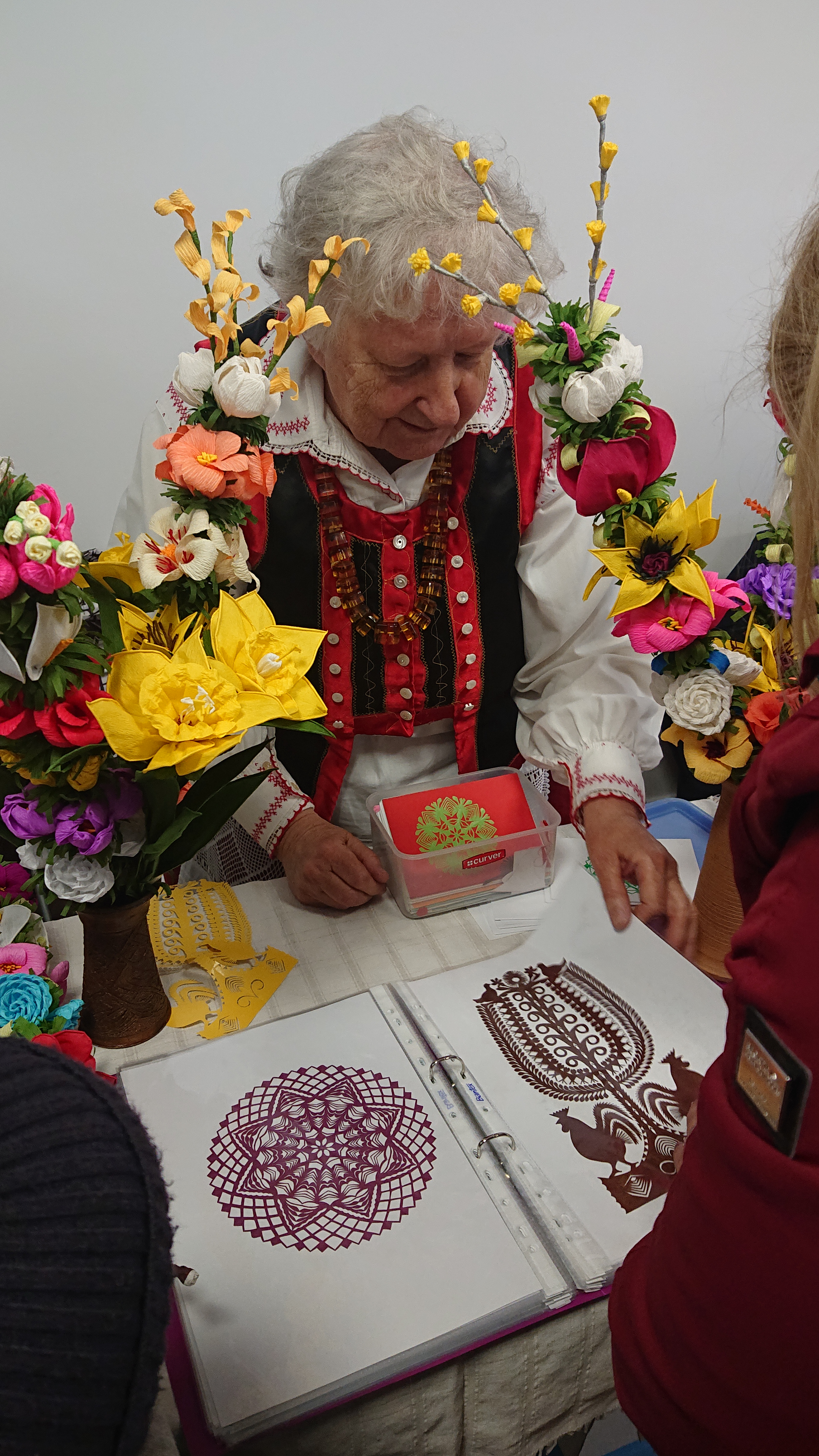
Czesława Marchewka at the fair during the Kurpie Palm competition in Łyse, 2022

The Museum of Kurpie Culture in Ostrołęka holds over 900 Kurpie paper cutouts in its collection and has a permanent exhibition entitled Wycinanka kurpiowska (Kurpie Paper Cutout), which presents works of artists from Puszcza Zielona and Puszcza Biała. A catalog of the exhibition has been published. In 2020, the museum prepared a board exhibition entitled Wycinanka kurpiowska z Puszczy Zielonej (Kurpie Paper Cutout from Puszcza Zielona), which, after being presented at the museum, traveled around the area and was also displayed at institutions outside the region. It was created in response to its inclusion on the national list of intangible cultural heritage. A catalog of the exhibition was published, with exhibition boards available online. In 2022, the museum published Wycinanka kurpiowska z Puszczy Zielonej. Dla małych, dużych i całkiem dorosłych (Kurpie Paper Cutout from Puszcza Zielona: For Small, Large, and Fully Grown).

In 2021, the Veterinary Museum of Wiesława and Waldemar Krzyżewski in Przasnysz organized a travelling board exhibition with postcards from the Kurpie region, including those depicting paper cutouts, along with a published exhibition catalogue.

Kurpie paper cutouts are also held in the collections of the Archaeological and Ethnographic Museum in Łódź, the Podlaskie Museum in Białystok, the Ethnographic Museum in Toruń, the Museum of Warmia and Masuria in Olsztyn, the Museum of Folk Culture in Węgorzewo, the Częstochowa Museum, and the National Museum in Poznań.

Paper cutouts from Puszcza Biała are preserved, among others, at the Regional Museum in Pułtusk, the Joachim Lelewel Public Library in Pułtusk, and educational institutions, such as the primary school in Gródek in Gmina Obryte and the Oskar Kolberg School and Nursery Complex in Karniewo.

In addition to group exhibitions presenting the profiles of paper cutout artists, exhibitions dedicated to the work of individual creators are also organized. Artists from Puszcza Zielona have participated in competitions and folklore events in the region, Cepeliads, and folk art fairs in Poland and abroad, earning many awards and distinctions.

Since 2014, the Władysław Skierkowski Regional Center of Kurpie Culture in Myszyniec has housed the Gallery of Kurpie Paper Cutout. The institution also hosts an annual competition, "Handicraft of the Kurpie Village", named after Anna Kordecka, a paper cutting artist from Puszcza Zielona.

Today, local governments, cultural institutions, and non-governmental organizations from the Kurpie region announce competitions for Kurpie paper cutouts or the use of this motif, often aimed at children and young people.

=== Cooperatives ===
After World War II, the Kurpie Creativity CPLiA Cooperative in Pułtusk played a major role in the development of paper cutting in Puszcza Biała, while in Puszcza Zielona, it was the Kurpianka CPLiA Cooperative in Kadzidło.

The cooperative in Pułtusk was established on the basis of a pre-war cooperative based in Gładczyn and then in Pniewo, founded by Wanda Modzelewska. Initially, it organized the sale of Kurpie embroidery from Puszcza Biała and was part of the Peasant Self-Help Union. In 1949, it joined the Cepelia Union of Folk and Artistic Handicraft Cooperatives, as the oldest among over 100 such organizations. From 1956, it operated in Pułtusk, where it introduced the production of ceramics and organized textile work under a putting-out system. Its products were based on traditional designs from Pułtusk County and Wyszków County. It also dealt with wood carving and paper cutouts. It was dissolved in 1991, after which the institution's care for the Kurpie paper cutouts from Puszcza Biała ended, contributing to its disappearance.

The Kadzidło cooperative was established in 1950. Initially, it produced and purchased fabrics before expanding its activities to include Kurpie embroidery from Puszcza Zielona, wickerwork, paper cutouts, folk sculptures, crêpe paper flowers, palm branches, decorated Easter eggs, straw mobiles, Christmas ornaments, and ritual breads known as byśki or nowe latka. The cooperative became the main employer for folk artists in the region, supplying them with glossy paper, wool, embroidery threads, and crêpe paper. Its activities were supported by one of its founders, the parson of Kadzidło parish, Father Mieczysław Mieszko. By promoting paper cutting artists from Puszcza Zielona, the cooperative contributed to the survival of this type of folk art and found markets for paper cutouts. At the peak of its activity, it had over 650 members. In addition, paper cutouts were made by people who were not employed by the cooperative, but were members of the families of the employed artists. The cooperative was closed in 2015.

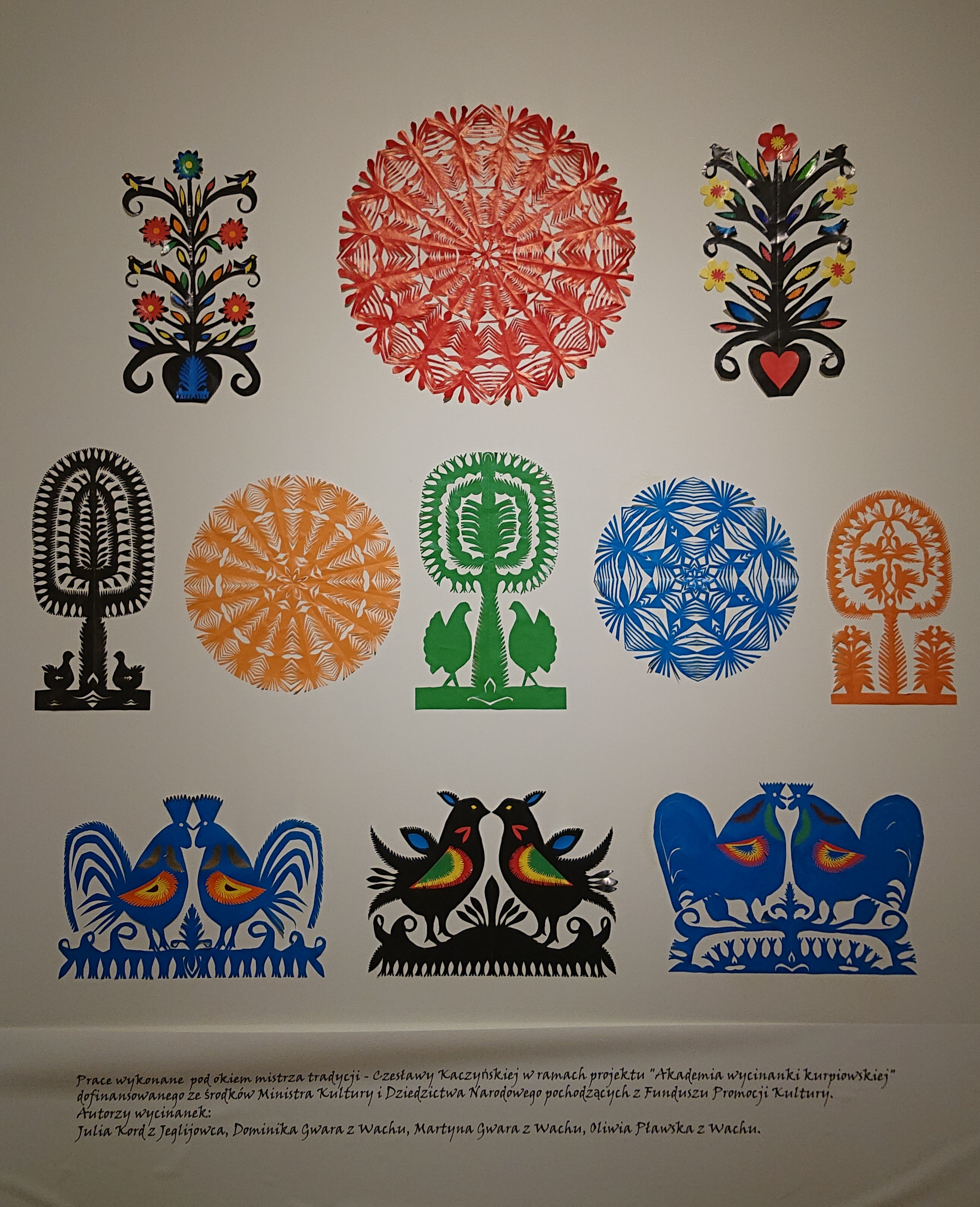
Paper cutouts made under the supervision of Czesława Kaczyńska as part of the "Academy of Kurpie Paper Cutout" project (2018). Photograph from an exhibition at the Museum of Kurpie Culture in Ostrołęka

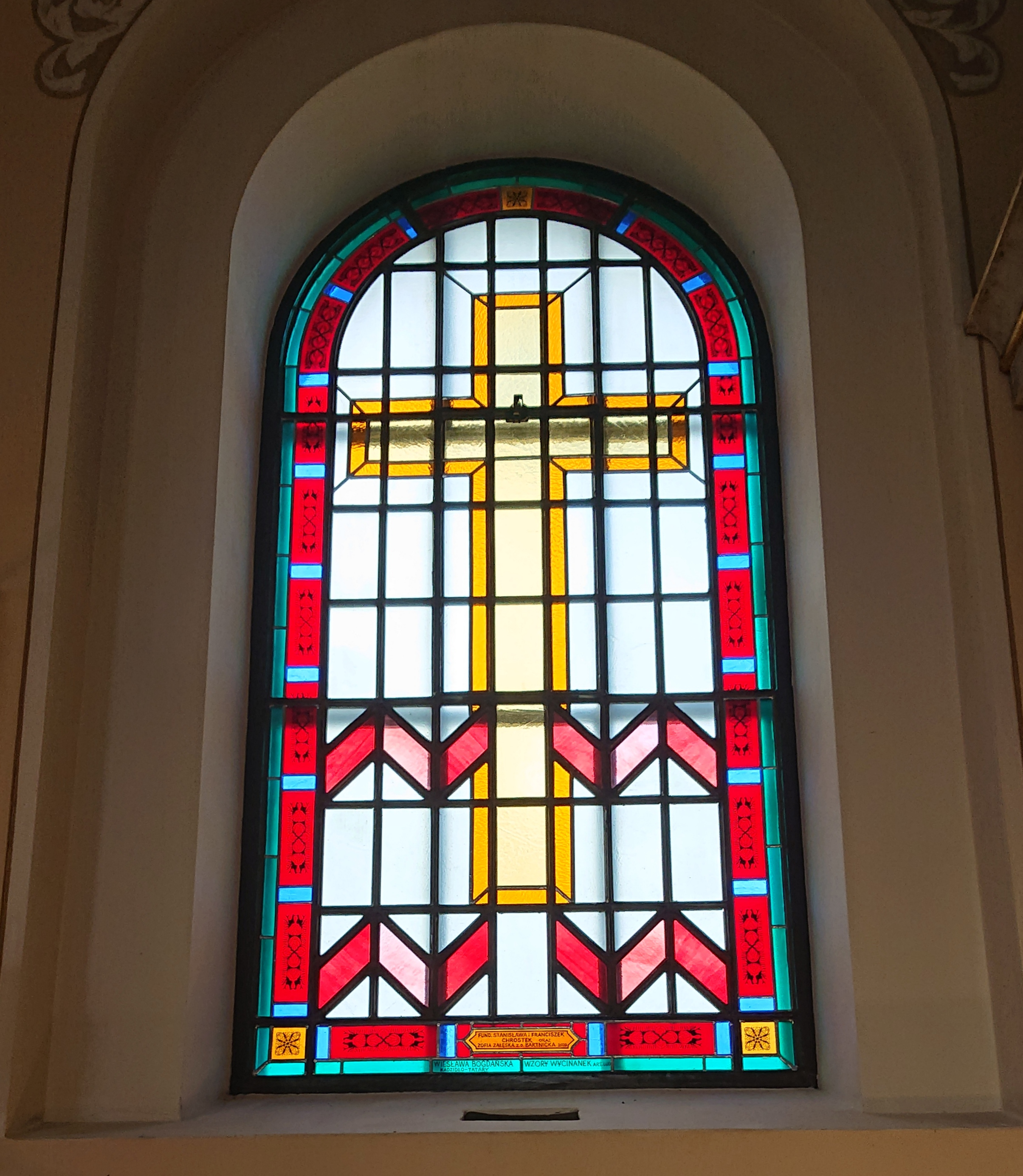
Stained glass window in the church in Lipniki using motifs from paper cutouts by Wiesława Bogdańska

=== Workshops ===
The Museum of Kurpie Culture in Ostrołęka runs regular workshops on Kurpie paper cutouts from Puszcza Zielona. Such events were also organized at the Municipal Cultural Center in Ostrów Mazowiecka and the Public Library in Brok. Regional cultural centers and libraries regularly offer workshops on Kurpie paper cutouts from Puszcza Zielona and Puszcza Biała. Museums and non-governmental organizations outside the Kurpie region, as well as foreign institutions, organize classes on Kurpie paper cutouts, inviting artists from the region to serve as instructors.

Kurpie paper cutting workshops take place in schools in the region and as lessons in museums. Paper cutting traditions are demonstrated during the "Disappearing Professions" ethnographic workshops at the Kurpie Farmstead in Kadzidło, where it was the theme of the event in 2010 and 2021. It also appears as part of Long Night of Museums.

The Museum of Kurpie Culture in Ostrołęka works to educate the younger generation of paper cutting artists from Puszcza Zielona through its ethno-design studio and projects such as the "Academy of Kurpie Paper Cutout" (2018), which consisted of meetings and workshops with Czesława Kaczyńska.

=== Design ===
The motif of Kurpie paper cutouts, and paper cutouts in general, appeared in design after World War II. Wanda Telakowska from the Institute of Industrial Design and head of the design team sent Helena and Lech Grześkiewicz to the Kurpie region. In the summer of 1950, they began working with artists from Kadzidło and Strzałki, including those practicing paper cutting. 12 people volunteered to work with the institute. The Kurpie women viewed the interiors for which curtains, tablecloths, and similar items were being designed, and familiarized themselves with the film printing technique. The work of the women from Puszcza Zielona was supervised successively by M. Bartodziejski, M. Załęska, and Andrzej Milwicz. Designers Stefania and Andrzej Milwicz drew inspiration from, among others, the works of Antonina Kuliś, Czesława Konopka, and Stanisława Bakuła. In collaboration with paper cutting artists, Helena and Lech Grześkiewicz designed printed fabrics for tablecloths and scarves. Initially, patterns from paper cutouts were transferred onto fabrics, but the reproduction of closed compositions, which, according to Telakowska, had a hieratic and decisive character, did not yield satisfactory results. In 1953, two paper cutting artists from Puszcza Zielona were invited to join the team, which also included two artists from Sanniki. They created compositions of patterns for clothing and decorative fabrics, as well as designs for children's clothing intended for urban consumers. Andrzej Milwicz also proposed transferring Kurpie paper cutouts onto fabric using hand printing and incorporating Kurpie motifs into mass production through photogravure.

During the Polish People's Republic era, Kurpie paper cutouts appeared in the form of framed pictures used to decorate homes, which was the result of the policy of Cepelia, the only distributor of folk art in the country at the time. Kurpie paper cutouts were considered an inexpensive gift for compatriots abroad. The motif of the cutouts returned after the political and economic transformation as an element of ethno-design.

In 2004, Magdalena Lubińska and Michał Kopaniszyn of Moho Design created the mohohej!Dia wool rug, shaped as a Kurpie cutout (a star). The pattern was laser-cut into felt, and the rug was made from several layers of material. The design received many awards: the Wallpaper Design Award in the Best Textile category in 2005, the Śląska Rzecz and Dobry Wzór awards in 2005, and – for the first time awarded to a Polish entity – the Red Dot Award for Product Design in 2008. In 2013, the Angella S. A. carpet factory from Białystok produced a series of carpets inspired by, among others, Kurpie paper cutouts. The Jagienka bedding, designed by Anna Stępkowska-Nowak, is decorated with elements from Kurpie paper cutouts, and the design of the Folk wall clock by the Laskowscy Design group (2010) also draws on Puszcza Zielona cutouts. Katarzyna Jarnuszkiewicz and Szymon Gaszczyński's Szanuj Zieleń Studio designed a lamp with an openwork Kurpie paper cutout motif.

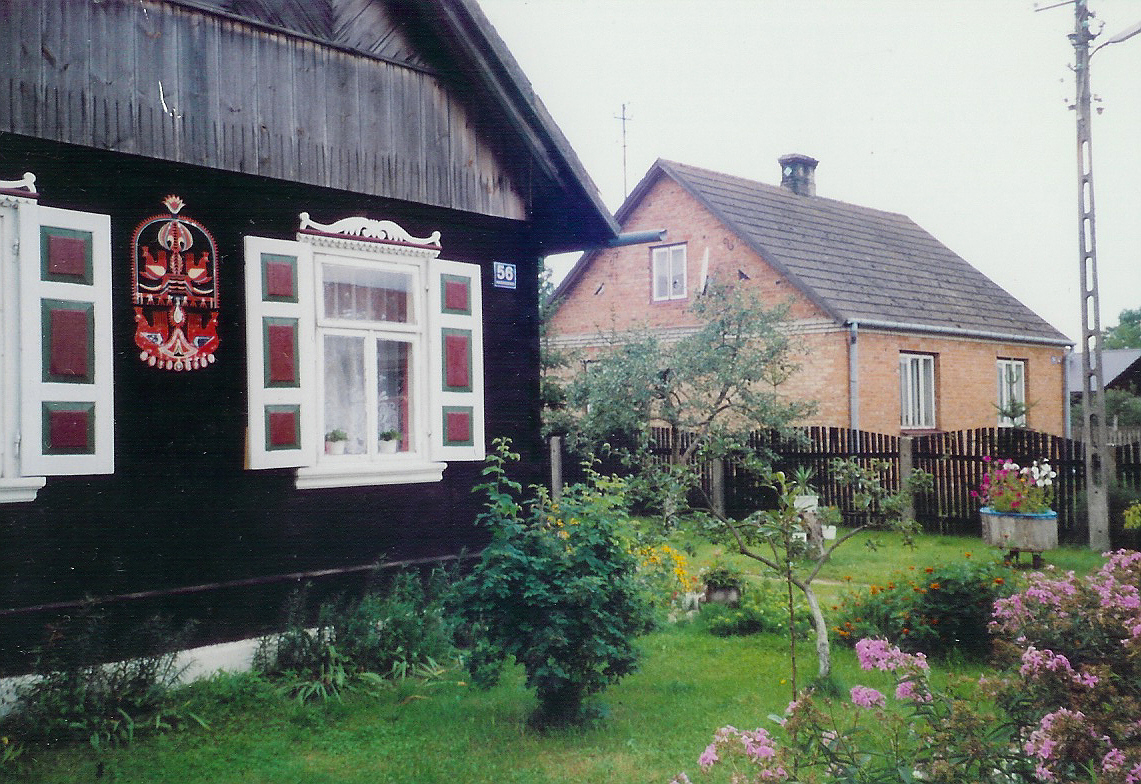
House in Nagoszewo decorated with a paper cutout motif from Puszcza Biała

In 2009, the State Ethnographic Museum in Warsaw and the Faculty of Industrial Design of the Academy of Fine Arts organized a competition for a modern museum souvenir, combining elements of folk art with contemporary form and function. One of the distinctions was awarded to Joanna Karbowiak for her design of a paint roller with a rooster motif from a Kurpie paper cutout. In the same year, Cepelia held a competition to mark the 60th anniversary of its founding. Third place went to Marta Krzyszkowska-Gierych for a T-shirt decorated with a motif of a black grouse from the Kurpie region. In 2013, "Polish-Belarusian Joint Actions" competition was organized by the Polish Ministry of Foreign Affairs. One of the participants, Monika Cecota, designed a "goat beer brewing set" decorated with a leluja pattern. In 2017, a bicycle rack with openwork motifs from Kurpie paper cutouts and embroidery from the Polish-Belarusian borderland was installed at Jadwiga Dziekońska Square in Białystok. The project was carried out as part of the "Folk on the Street" campaign, coordinated since 2012 by the Voivodeship Center for Cultural Animation in Białystok.

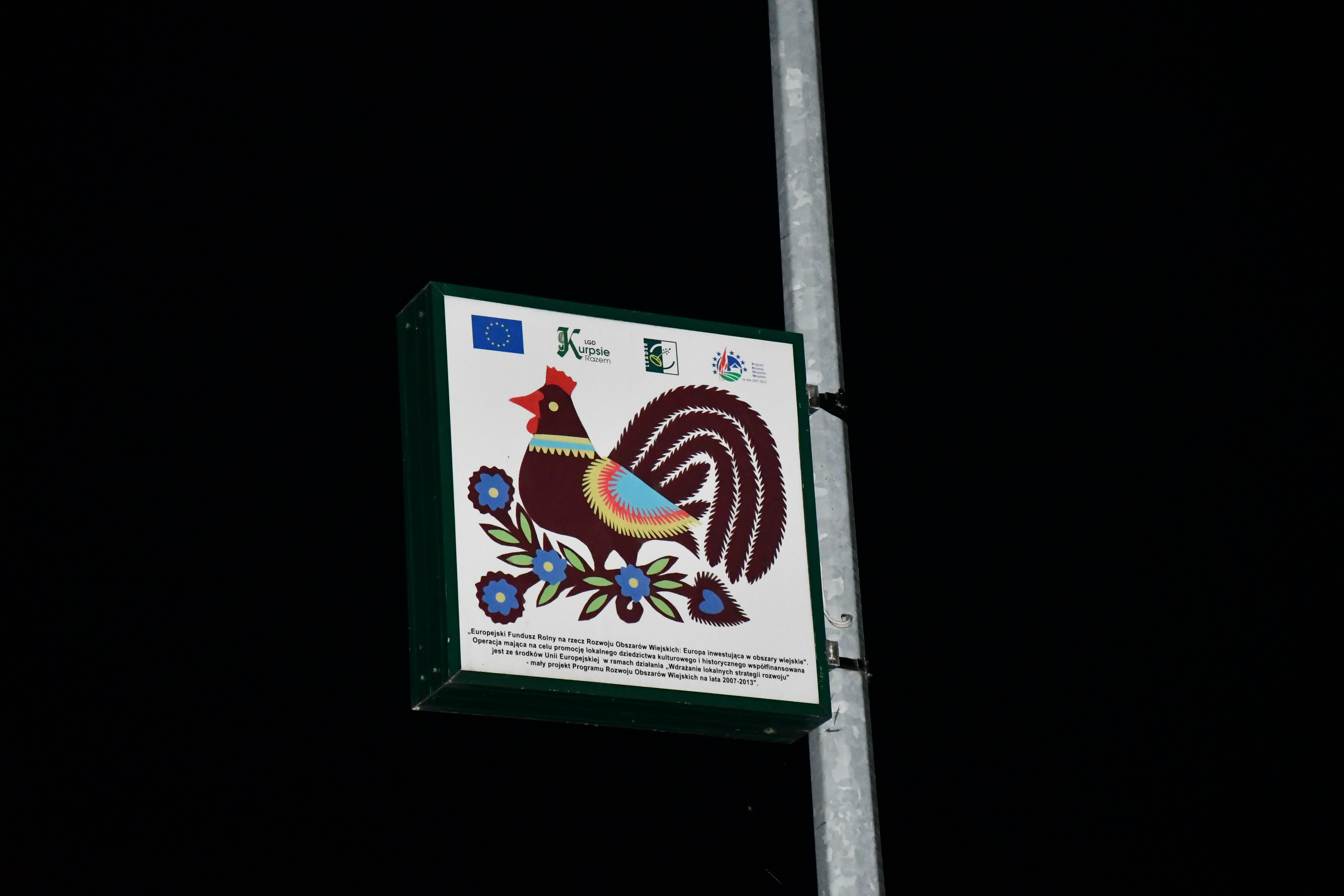
Street lamp in Myszyniec decorated with a paper cutout from Puszcza Zielona

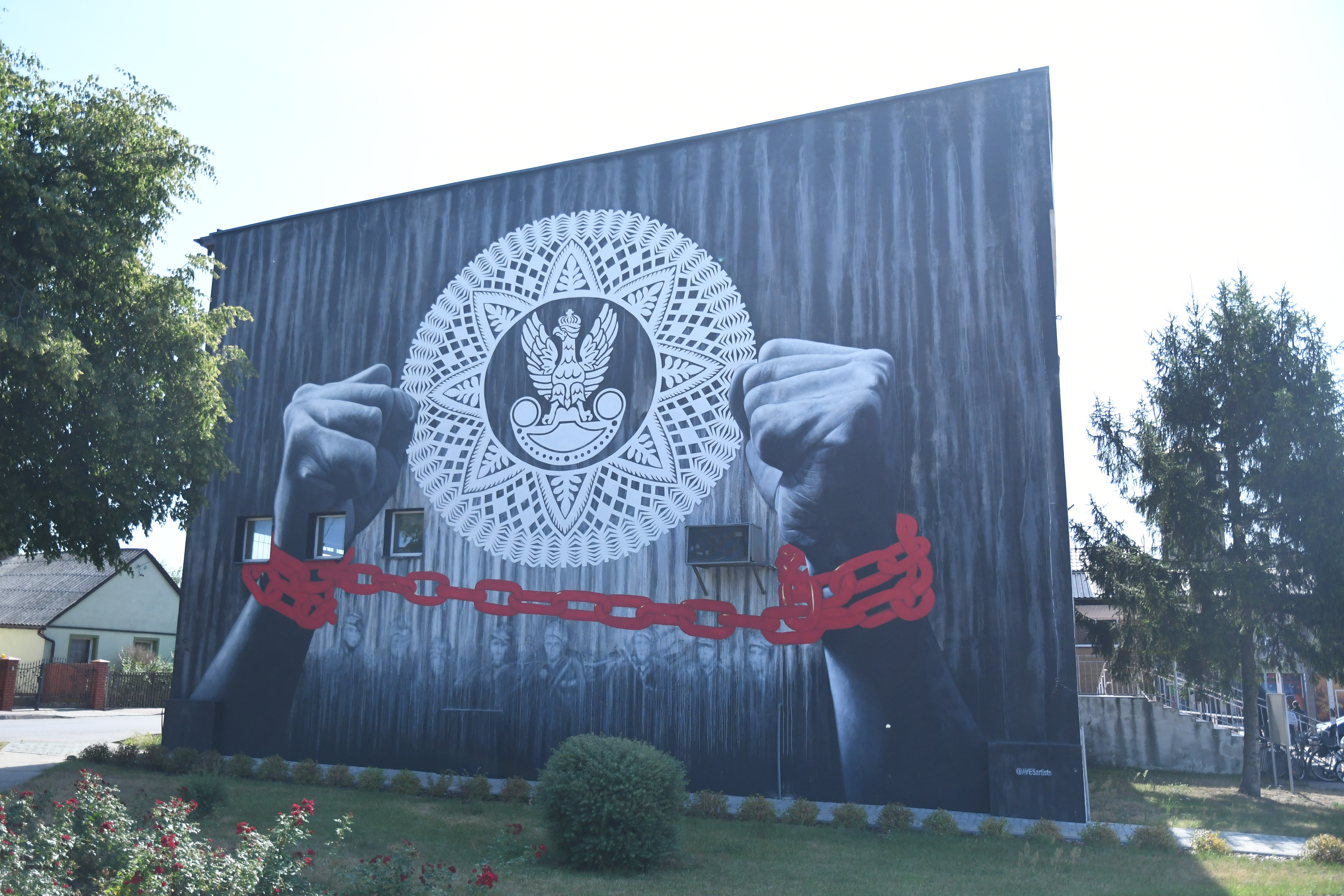
Mural in Myszyniec commemorating the cursed soldiers, unveiled in 2019

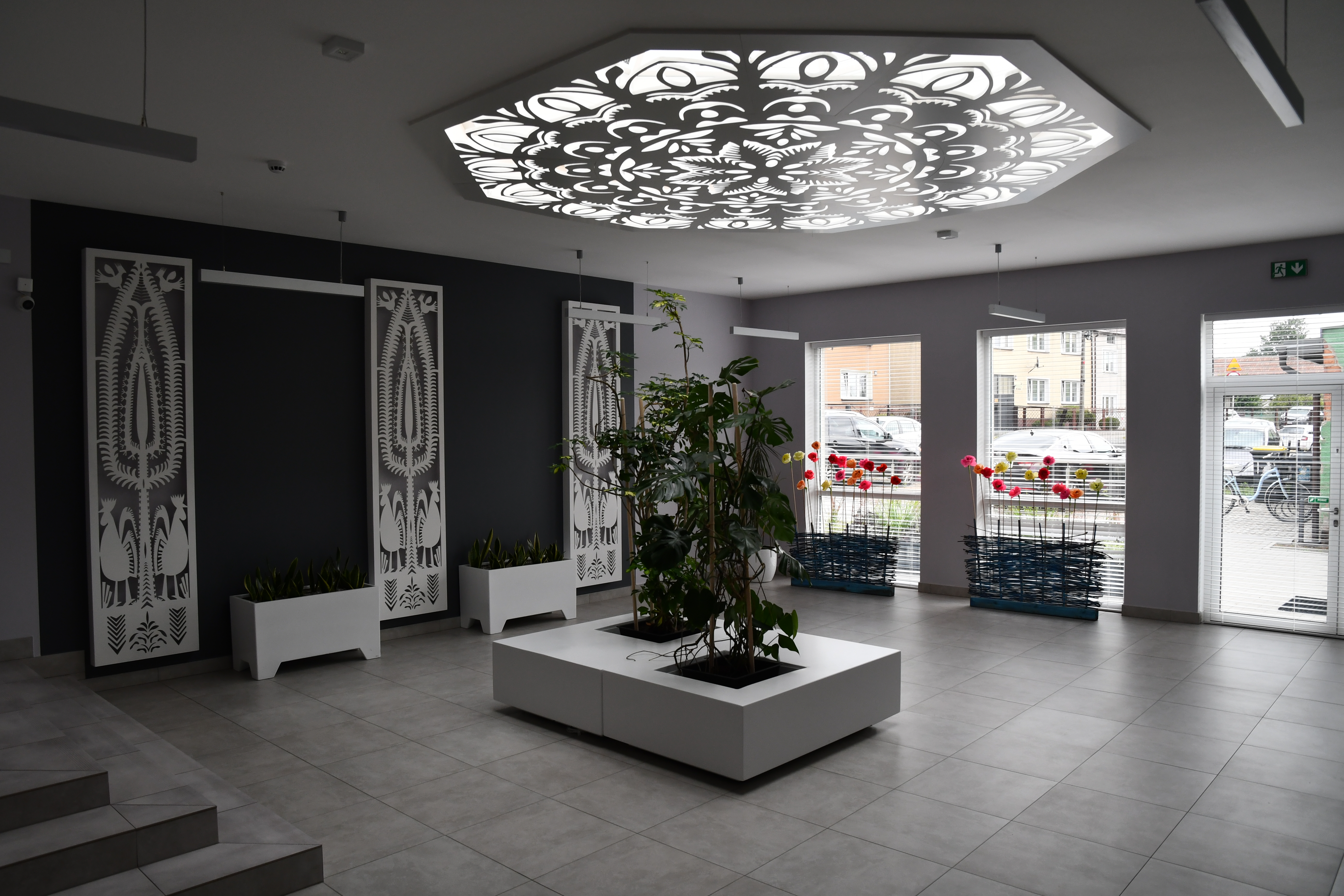
Interior of the Władysław Skierkowski Regional Center of Kurpie Culture in Myszyniec decorated with paper cutouts

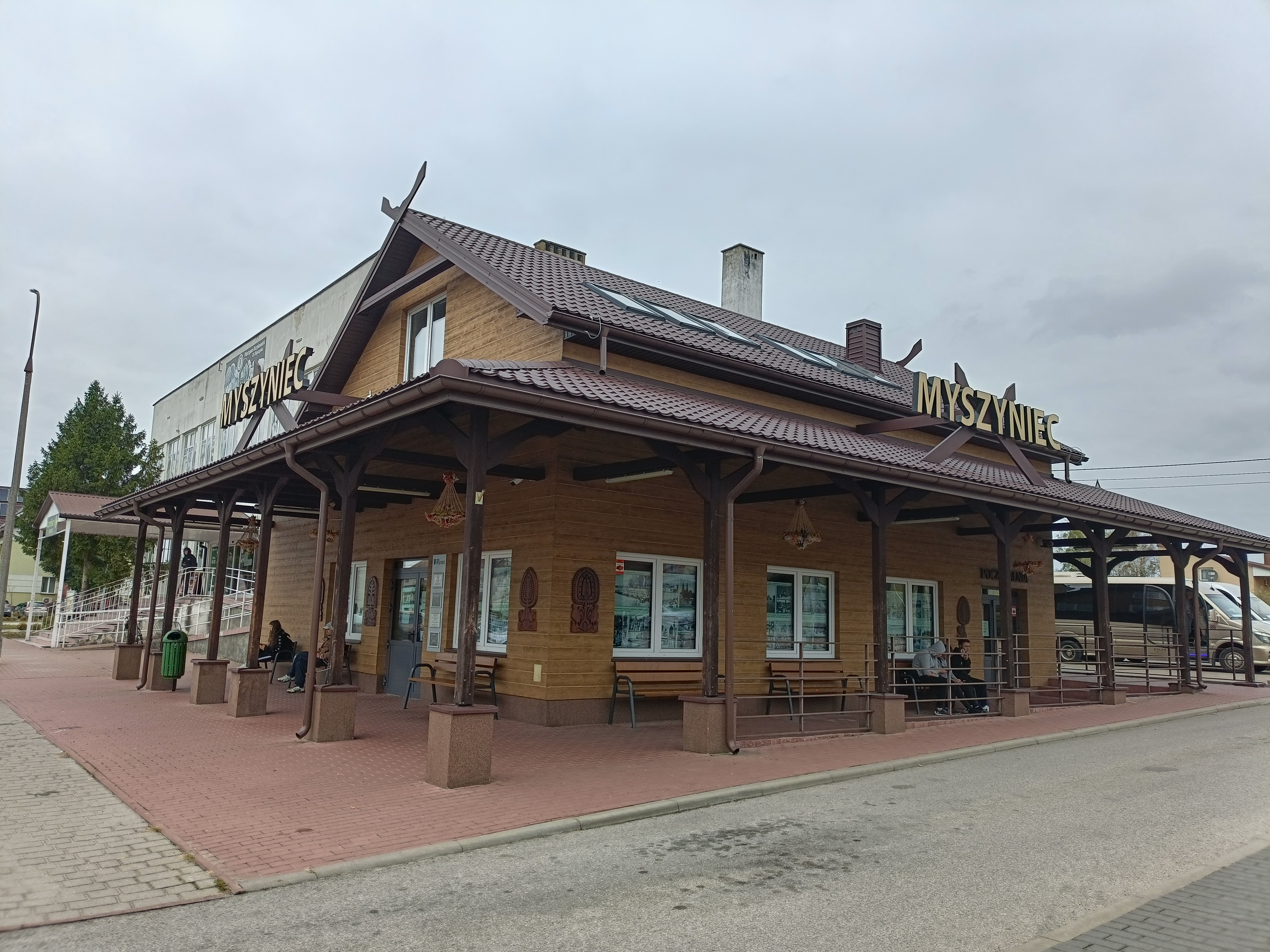
Bus station in Myszyniec decorated with paper cutouts

Kurpie paper cutouts are also used in interior design. In 2019, motifs from cutouts of Czesława Kaczyńska and Wiesława Bogdańska were placed on stained glass windows in the church in Dylewo, and in 2020, Wiesława Bogdańska's cutouts decorated stained glass windows in the church in Lipniki. The polychrome decoration of the Church of St. John the Baptist in Turośl is adorned with Kurpie paper cutouts. The new wing of the Museum of Kurpie Culture in Ostrołęka, created as part of the "Revitalisation: Per causam ad animi" project, has housed a café since 2018; the facade of the building is decorated with Kurpie lelujas motifs.

In Puszcza Zielona, paper cutouts decorate the interiors of many museums, cultural institutions, and municipal offices. They are placed on public buildings to emphasize the "Kurpie character" of the place. They also can be found on street lamps in Myszyniec, are used as advertising motifs for businesses (a dairy in Baranowo, a pharmacy in Kadzidło), and have been placed on market stalls in Kadzidło. Additionally, Kurpie paper cutouts are used by restaurants outside the region. Easter eggs from Puszcza Zielona are decorated with geometric patterns similar to those on paper cutouts.

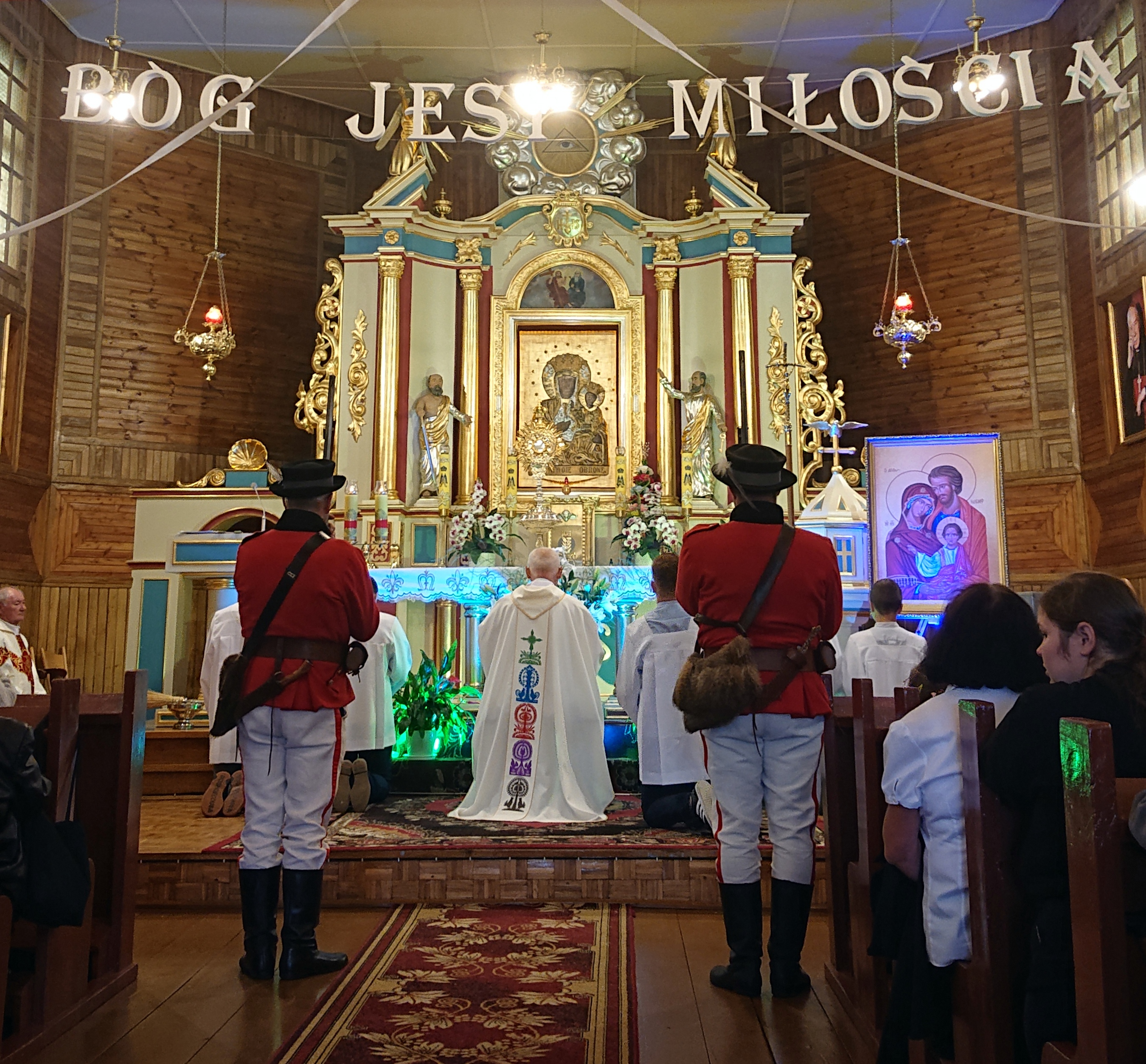
Father Jerzy Ciak, parson of Brodowe Łąki, in a vestment decorated with Kurpie paper cutouts

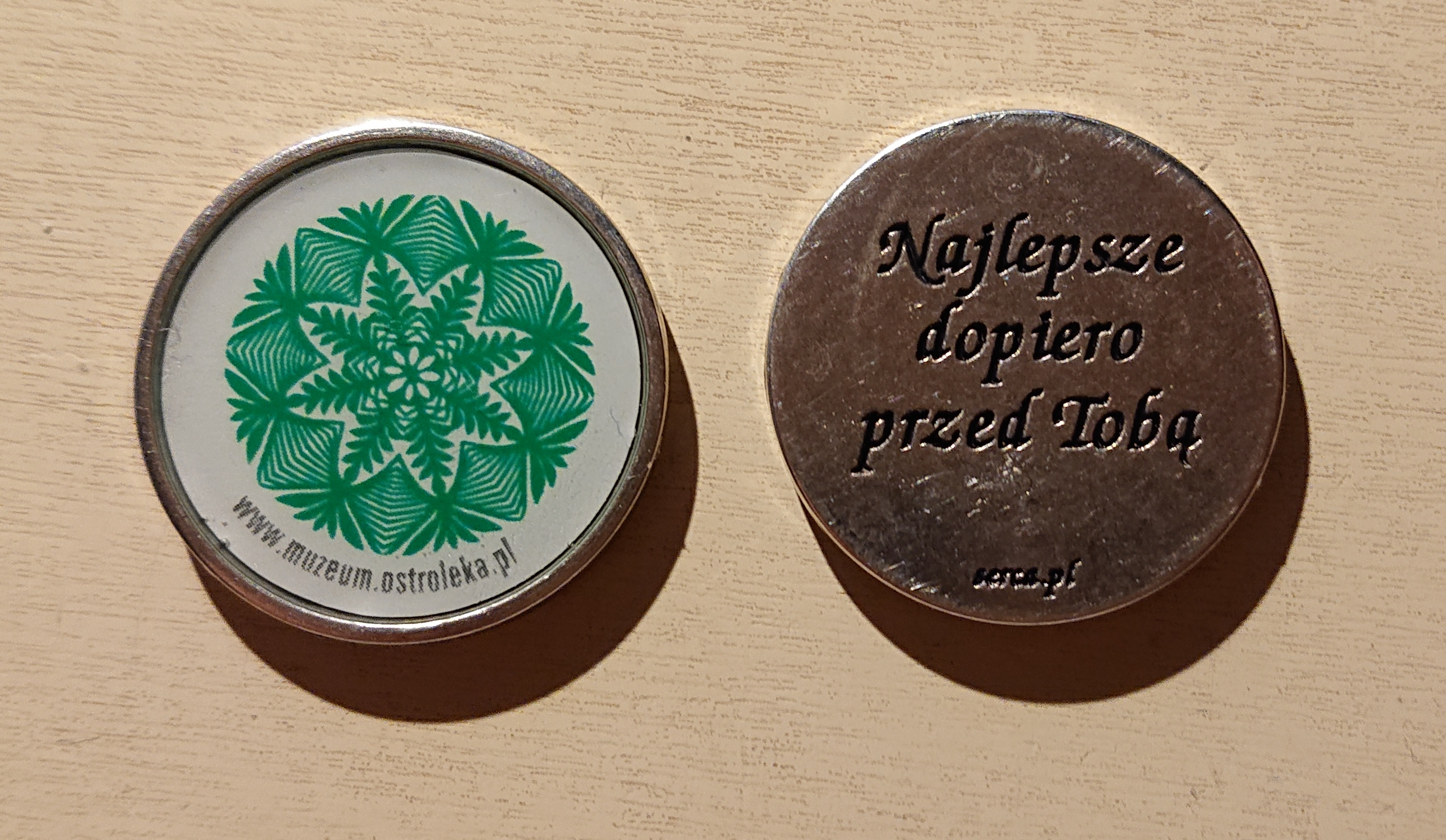
Shopping trolley tokens with a Kurpie paper cutout motif from Puszcza Zielona, a souvenir item from the Museum of Kurpie Culture in Ostrołęka

The paper cutout also appears as an element of commemoration. On 25 June 1922, a monument erected on the initiative of Adam Chętnik was unveiled in the forest near Jednaczewo, honoring the legendary hero Stach Konwa, designed by Rudolf Macura. The monument took the form of a chapel made of pine bee-keeping log (barć). Kurpie paper cutouts were carved on three of its walls (except for the front one) and painted blue. The monument was destroyed by Soviet forces in 1939. The motif also appears as an element of a mural in Myszyniec on the building at Freedom Square – commemorating the cursed soldiers – as well as on commemorative plaques, such as the memorial to Adam Chętnik installed in 1980 in the Cathedral of St. Michael the Archangel in Łomża. For some time, a Kurpie paper cutout in the form of a leluja was one of the welcome signs at the entrance to Ostrołęka on Warszawska Street. Paper cutouts are placed on welcome signs at the entrances to Kurpie gminas.

The Medal of Merit for Huntsmen of Ostrołęka Voivodeship, designed by Wiesław Siennicki, and the Medal of Merit for the Ostrołęka Voivodeship, designed and created by Władysław Zabłocki, are both modeled on Kurpie paper cutouts. In the early years of the Kurpik Award, presented by the President of the Kurpie Association, the wooden statuettes were decorated with a star motif from Puszcza Zielona.

In 2001, fashion designer Arkadius designed the "Paulina" collection, in which he used, among others, Kurpie paper cutouts, including red and blue leluja motifs and colorful roosters. In 2018, fashion designer Patrycja Kujawa created a wedding dress with a red leluja pattern for Kurpie woman Ewa Mielnicka, Miss Polski 2014.

At the Collegiate Basilica of the Holy Trinity in Myszyniec, priests wear chasubles decorated with Kurpie paper cutouts during important ceremonies. Such vestments are also used in the Parish of St. Michael the Archangel in Brodowe Łąki. The Kurpie weaver Anna Bałdyga applies paper cutout motifs to folk textiles. In 2021, an exhibition of her works, entitled Wycinanka kurpiowska na tkaninie (Kurpie Paper Cutout on Fabric), was organized at the Municipal Cultural Center in Wydminy.

Kurpie paper cutouts have also been adapted as tattoo designs. Illustrator Marek Sachmata creates artworks which combine characters from popular culture with Kurpie folklore. He also creates his own superheroes. His works often feature Kurpie paper cutouts from Puszcza Zielona as a backdrop.

The Museum of Kurpie Culture in Ostrołęka operates an ethno-design studio where visitors can create, draw inspiration from, and play with Kurpie paper cutouts. Handicraft workshops are also held there. The Municipal Cultural Center in Ostrów Mazowiecka organizes ethno-design workshops using Kurpie paper cutouts from Puszcza Zielona and Puszcza Biała.

=== Cultural texts and souvenirs ===
Yolanta Nitka-Nikt incorporated motifs from the paper cutouts of Apolonia Nowak and Stanisława Dawid into her collages. In 2015, Marianna Oklejak illustrated the book Cuda wianki. Polski folklor dla młodszych i starszych (Wonder Wreaths: Polish Folklore for Young and Old) with motifs from Kurpie paper cutouts.

Kurpie cutouts also appear on the covers of many publications issued in Puszcza Zielona, mainly those of the Kurpie Association, the Museum of Kurpie Culture in Ostrołęka, and the Kurpsie Razem Local Action Group.

The motif appears on the business cards of people who identify with the Kurpie region or hold public office, as well as in the letterheads of institutions from the Kurpie area.

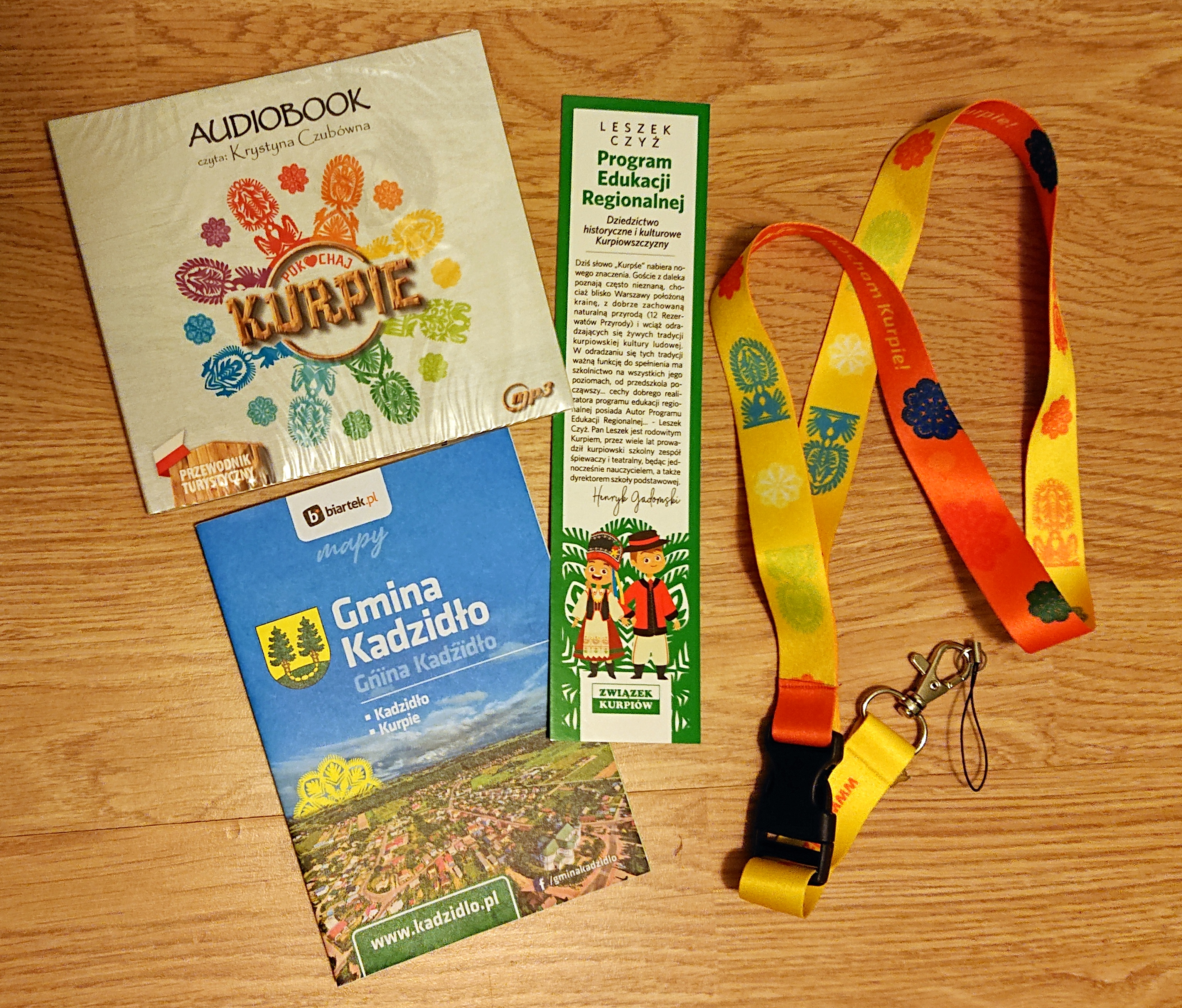
Promotional materials and publications with paper cutouts from Puszcza Zielona

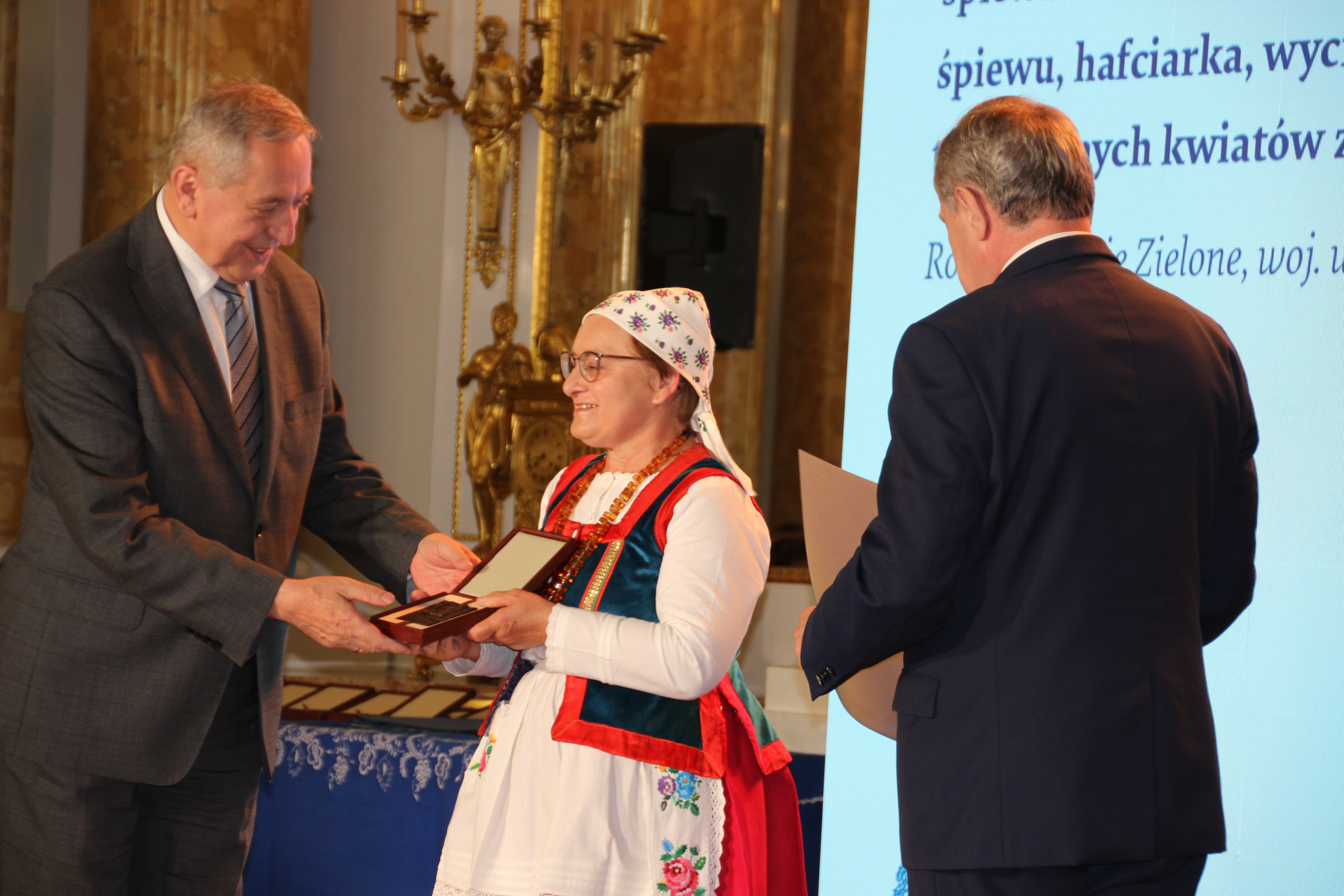
Elżbieta Kasznia, a folk artist from Puszcza Zielona (including paper cutting), receiving the Oskar Kolberg Award in 2022

Kurpie paper cutouts are used to identify companies from various industries, as well as local government and cultural institutions. For example, the Museum of Kurpie Culture in Ostrołęka and Gmina Kadzidło use paper cutouts from Puszcza Zielona on souvenirs and promotional items. Many souvenir shops sell gadgets with Kurpie paper cutout motifs.

In 2016, during the "Miasto/Wieś" (City/Village) concert at the Witold Lutosławski Concert Studio of Polskie Radio, which inaugurated the Independent Stage of Polish Radio, the Pijana Sypialnia Theater presented Daniel Zieliński's play Wycinanki kurpiowskie (Kurpie Paper Cutouts). In the composition, six dances from Puszcza Zielona intertwine like motifs in a Kurpie paper cutout.

== Awards and recognition ==
In March 2020, the paper cutting tradition of Puszcza Zielona was entered into the National List of Intangible Cultural Heritage as "Kurpie paper cutting from Puszcza Zielona," which increased the prestige of Kurpie artists and popularized the art form.

A square has been created next to the Gmina Kadzidło Office building, with a pole displaying plaques bearing the names of folk artists from the gmina, including paper cutting artists. Kadzidło is home to the Memorial Chamber of Czesława Konopka, one of the most famous paper cutting artists in Poland.

== See also ==
- Vytynanky (Wycinanki)
- Jewish paper cutting

== Bibliography ==
- Biernacka, Paulina (2019). "Wycinanki kurpiowskie dawniej i współcześnie w analizie źródeł ikonograficznych oraz w relacjach rozmówców z obszarów Kurpiowszczyzny" [Kurpie Paper Cutouts Past and Present in the Analysis of Iconographic Sources and in Accounts of Interviewees from the Kurpie Region]. In Wardzyński, Michał; Pieńkos, Andrzej (eds.). Sztuka na Mazowszu. Nowe otwarcie [Art in Masovia: A New Opening] (in Polish). Warsaw: Mazowiecki Instytut Kultury. ISBN 978-83-63427-27-6.
- Braun, Krzysztof (2017). "Symboliczny krajobraz Kurpiowszczyzny" [The Symbolic Landscape of the Kurpie Land]. Rocznik Mazowiecki (in Polish). 28. ISSN 0080-3529.
- Krzyżewski, Waldemar (2021). Kurpie na XX-wiecznych widokówkach ze zbiorów Muzeum Weterynarii Wiesławy i Waldemara Krzyżewskich w Przasnyszu. Katalog wystawy [The Kurpie People on 20th-Century Postcards from the Collections of the Veterinary Museum of Wiesława and Waldemar Krzyżewski in Przasnysz: Exhibition Catalogue] (in Polish). Przasnysz: Veterinary Museum of Wiesława and Waldemar Krzyżewski in Przasnysz. ISBN 978-83-954294-1-5.
- Samsel, Maria; Dul, Robert Andrzej (2020). Wycinanka kurpiowska z Puszczy Zielonej. Katalog wystawy [The Kurpie Paper-Cutting from the Green Forest: Exhibition Catalogue] (in Polish). Ostrołęka: Museum of Kurpie Culture. ISBN 978-83-953620-5-7.
- Śledziewski, Antoni; Demska, Anna (2015). Zaczęło się w Jeziornie... O wycinance i jej obecności we współczesnym projektowaniu [It Began in Jeziorna: On the Paper Cutout and Its Presence in Contemporary Design] (in Polish). Konstancin-Jeziorna: Konstancin Cultural Center. ISBN 978-83-934704-3-3.
