= Paper cut sculpture =

Paper cut sculpture, a form of papercutting, is a contemporary development of a traditional art form. Instead of flat, two-dimensional pieces, the art is given a three-dimensional form. Different artists have used a variety of different methods. A notable example is Nahoko Kojima, a Japanese artist who utilised nylon threads to suspend individual large sheets of washi paper to form the bodies of animals and other natural figures.

== See also ==
- Leaf carving
- Scherenschnitte
- Silhouette
- Vytynanky (Wycinanki)
- Origami
- Kirie (art)
- Kirigami
- Pop-up book
- Diorama – Three-dimensional full-size or miniature model
