= Jewish paper cutting =

Jewish folk art

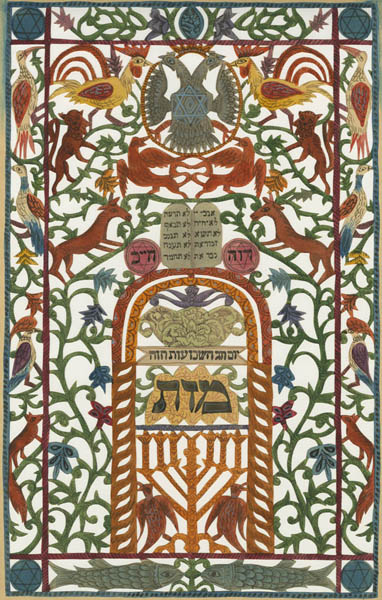
Shavuot papercut

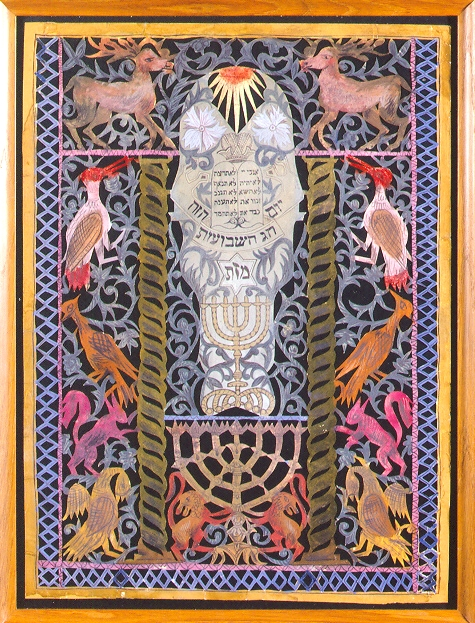
Coloured silhouette in mixed technique with Jewish symbols, 19th century, in the collection of the Jewish Museum of Switzerland

Jewish paper cutting is a traditional form of Jewish folk art made by cutting figures and sentences in paper or parchment. It is connected with various customs and ceremonies, and associated with holidays and family life. Paper cuts often decorated ketubbot (marriage contracts), Mizrahs, and ornaments for festive occasions. Paper cutting was practiced by Jewish communities in both Eastern Europe and North Africa and the Middle East for centuries and has seen a revival in modern times in Israel and elsewhere.

== History ==
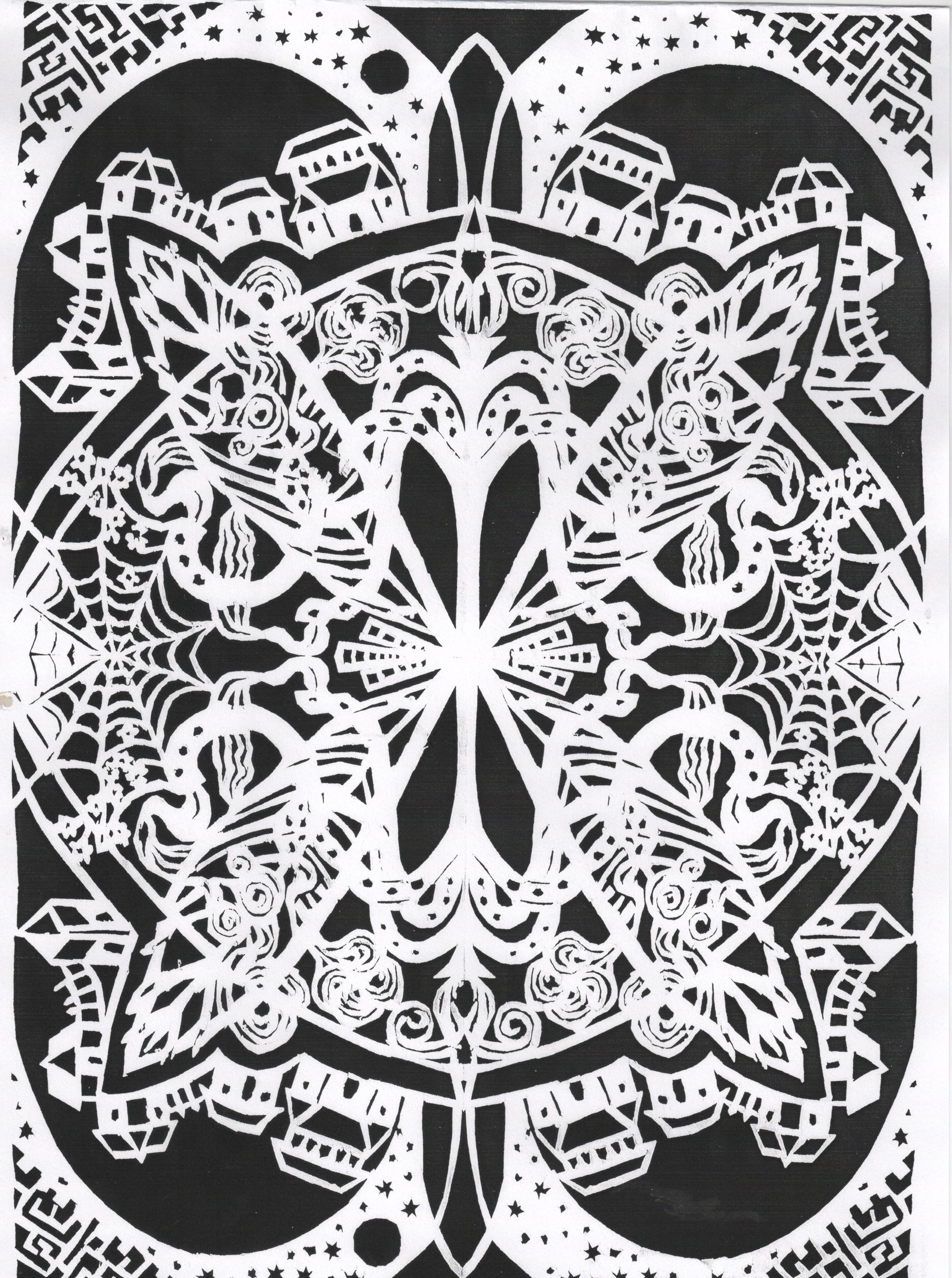
Jewish papercut "The World" by Agata Szepe

=== Origins ===
The origin of Jewish paper cutting is unclear. Ashkenazi Jews in the seventeenth and eighteenth centuries practiced this type of art. However, Jewish paper cuts can be traced to Jewish communities in Syria, Iraq, and North Africa, and the similarity in the cutting techniques (using a knife) between East European Jews and Chinese paper cutters, may indicate that the origin goes back even further. Some contend that Ashkenazi paper-cutting may date to the 14th century, though its popularity reached a zenith in the 18th and 19th centuries.

The first mention of Jewish paper cutting can be found in the treatise "The fight of the pen and the scissors" by a 14th-century rabbi, Shem Tov ben Isaac ben Ardutiel (1290–1369), who describes how he decided to cut letters in paper when his ink became frozen during a harsh winter. To students of Christian Spanish literary history, Rabbi Shem Tov is known as Santob de Carrion de los Condes, the courtly Castilian troubadour who composed the Proverbios morales for Pedro the Cruel. Paper cutting as a folk craft gained popularity in the nineteenth century when paper became a cheap material.

Paper cutting was widespread among the Jews of Poland and Russia in the nineteenth century and the early years of the twentieth century. Jewish paper cuts were also produced in Germany and probably in the Netherlands. Some Italian Jewish parchment ketubot (marriage contracts) from the late 17th century until the nineteenth century were decorated paper cuts as well as some elaborate scrolls of the Book of Esther. Similar paper cuttings from Jewish communities North Africa and the Middle East have some characteristic style differences.

It was popular among Jews both in eastern and western Europe as well as in Turkey, Morocco, Syria, Bangladesh, Israel, and North America.

In North Africa and the Middle East paper cuts were called a "Menorah", because one or more menorah, always appeared as the central motif. These paper cuts included many inscriptions, mostly on the arms of the candelabras. The paper was mounted on thin, colored metal sheets. Two distinct kinds were produced: a Mizrah and smaller paper cuts used as charms. The motifs are the same as in European Jewish paper cuts but they have a distinctive Eastern style. Also, the hamsa ("the five-finger hand"), unknown in Europe, very often appears on these paper cuts.

=== Disappearance ===
Jewish paper cutting began disappearing in the first half of the twentieth century, mainly because of the rapid assimilation trends and the waning of many traditional practices, and was practiced only by older people who remembered this art form from their youth. Many paper cuts collections that had been preserved were destroyed during World War II and the Holocaust and relatively few remain in public or private collections.

=== Resurgence ===
Since the late twentieth century, Jewish paper cuts have again become a popular art form in both Israel and other countries. Paper cutting is again often used to decorate ketubot, wedding invitations, and works of art. To a limited extent, Jewish paper cuts have become more popular in Poland as a result of the Jewish Culture Festival in Kraków, a festival that has been held in Kraków since the 1990s.

Beit Hatefutsot – The Museum of the Jewish People in Tel Aviv, Israel presented a 2009 exhibition called "The Revival of Jewish Papercuts: Jewish paper cut art" in October 2009. The exhibit was curated by Prof. Olga Goldberg, Gabriella Rabbi, Rina Biran, the Giza Frenkel Papercut Archive, the Hebrew University of Jerusalem. Additionally, a National Science Foundation-funded study called "Tradition and Continuity in Jewish Papercuts" was conducted by Prof. Olga Goldberg.

Artist Oren Loloi writes that the art of Jewish papercutting's resurgence is due in large part to the efforts of Polish-Jewish anthropologist and ethnologist Giza Frankel (see below). Frankel's 1983 book, The Art of the Jewish Papercut (Migzerot neyar: omanut Yehudit amamit), was produced after 50 years of painstaking research.

Today, Jewish papercut art has grown in popularity beyond ritual items to art and expressions of Jewish faith, not only in Israel but worldwide. Loloi contends that the resurgence in papercutting's popularity is in part due to its contemporary near-ubiquity as part of the ketubah (marriage contract), which is a contemporary site of hiddur mitzvah, the Jewish principle of honouring the Divine by beautifying ritual objects. Contemporary papercutting art may also be seen in amulets like hamsas, blessings for the home, mizrahim, and other art pieces, usually as a wall plaque.

== Artists ==
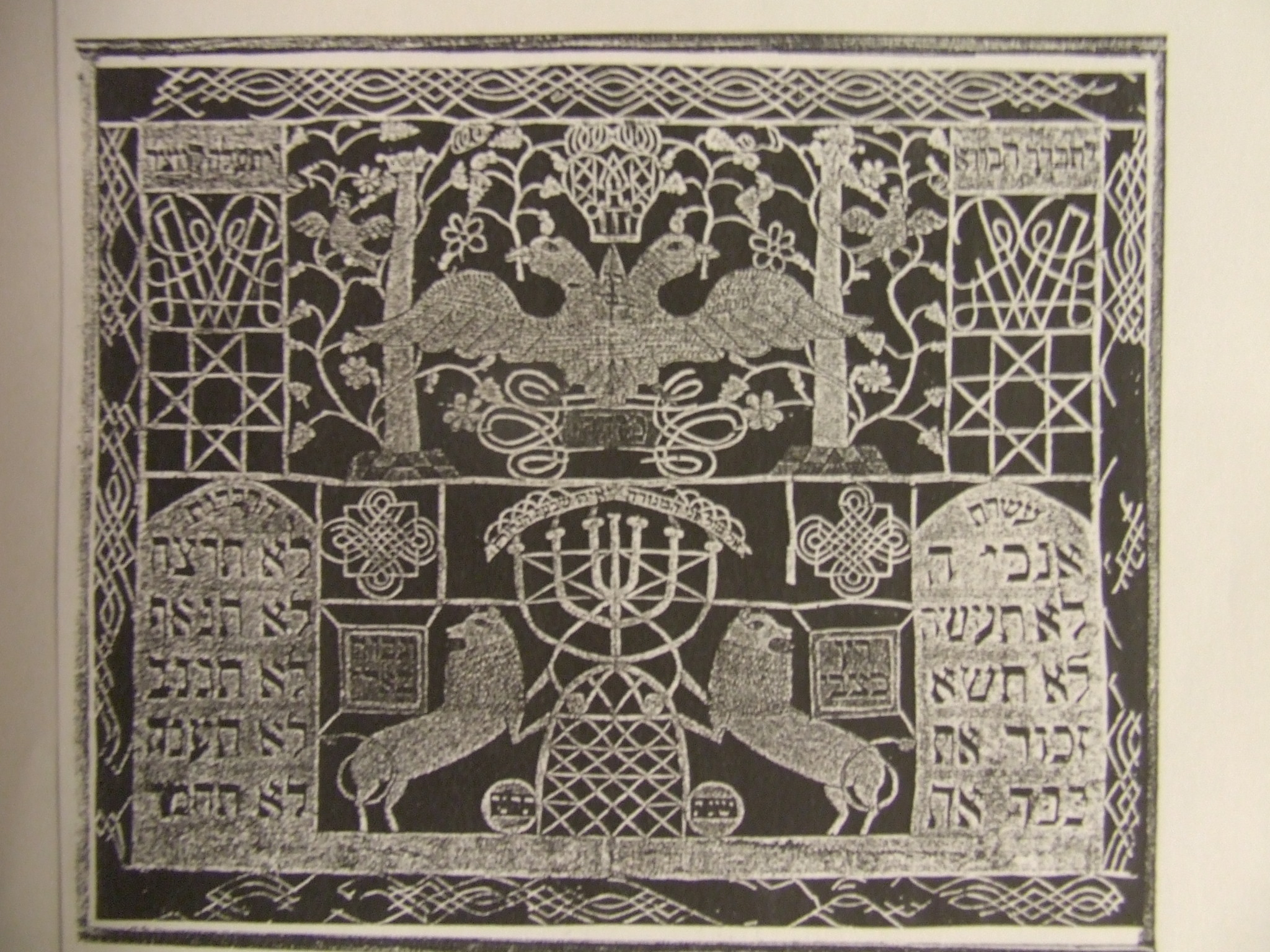
Jewish papercutting

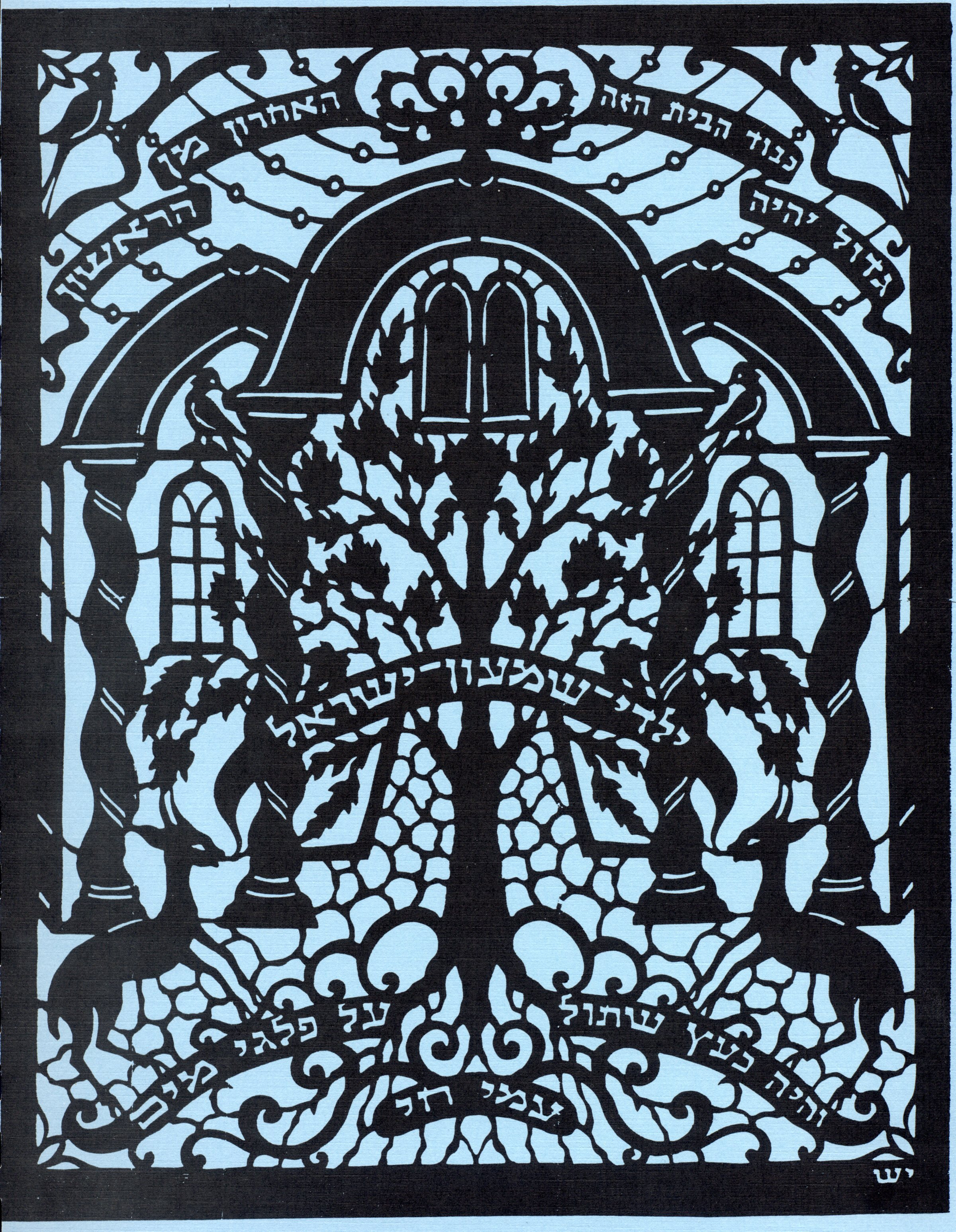
Family tree booklet cover artwork created by Yehudit Shadur

=== Giza Frankel ===
In Israel papercutting was reactivated by Giza Frankel, a Polish-born ethnographer. Frankel's most significant publications on paper cutting are Wycinanka żydowska w Polsce and Art of the Jewish Paper Cut. Giza Frankel emigrated to Israel in 1950.

=== Marta Gołąb ===
Marta Gołąb is both a graphic artist and papercutter. Her papercuts were exhibited in the Jewish Museum (Wien) Skirball Cultural Center, (Los Angeles), in Emanu-El Synagogue (San Francisco), in the Synagogue in Grobzig (Germany) and on the Jewish Culture Festival in Krakow.

=== Monika Krajewska ===
Monika Krajewska's interests focus on symbols related both to Jewish papercut and sepulchral art, according to Wycinanka żydowska. She has been a member of The Guild of American Papercutters.

=== Yehudit and Joseph Shadur ===
Yehudit Shadur (1928–2011) was a Jewish paper cutting artist, art historian, and collector. Yehudit's artwork appears in the collections of the Smithsonian Institution, US Library of Congress, Israel Museum, Museum der Kulturen, Basel, and elsewhere across the world.

Yehudit Shadur and her husband Joseph Shadur wrote three books together, including Jewish Papercuts: A History and Guide, Gefen Publishing House/ Judah Magnes Museum 1994, for which they won a National Jewish Book Council Award In addition, the Shadurs wrote Traditional Jewish Papercuts: An Inner World of Art and Symbol, Hanover NH & London: University Press of New England, 2002, and Jerusalem from Generation to Generation. Papercuts by Yehudit Shadur, Eretz-Israel Museum exhibition catalog, Tel Aviv, 1995, which was the catalog for Shadur's exhibit that year, and several articles on the art of Jewish papercutting. Yehudit Shadur collaborated artistically late in life with her daughter Tamar Shadur, a textile artist.

=== Tsirl Waletzky ===
Tsirl Waletzky (née Tsirl Grobla; 1921–2011) was a major contemporary paper cutting artist in American Yiddish culture. Waletzky's papercuts differed from "traditional forms in that they are free flowing and less bound to structure and symmetry."

=== Oren Loloi ===
Oren Loloi (Papercuts By Oren), is a modern Jewish paper cut artist working in Israel. His work belongs to a new aesthetic that bridges the gap between Jewish tradition and the modern resurgence of paper cutting worldwide. His work mainly focuses on ketubot. He has also been commissioned by synagogues in New York and Virginia for large scale works.

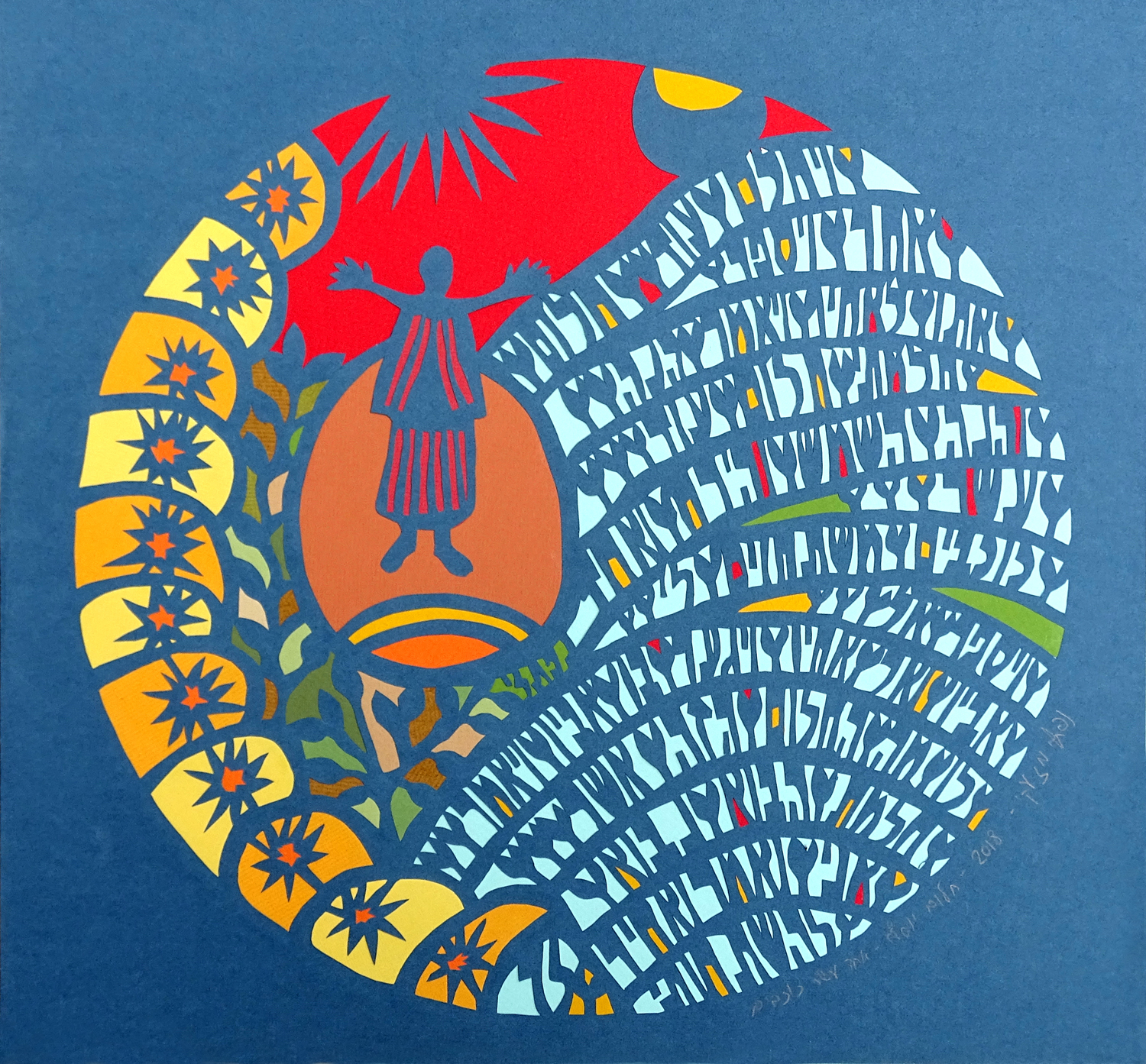

=== Naftaly Mazaky ===
Mazaky is a contemporary Israeli artist, inspired by the works of Yemenite Jews who designed and crafted silver Judaica and jewelry. He is a "Yemenite Papercutter-Jeweler". Mazaky's papercuttings have been on exhibit at the Schechter Institute of Jewish Studies, the Museum of Jewish Art in Jerusalem, and at the Yemenite Heritage Centers in Rehovot and Netanya. His papercuttings showcase excerpts from Biblical sources intertwined with graphic scenes of nature and culture.

=== Isaac Brynjegard-Bialik ===
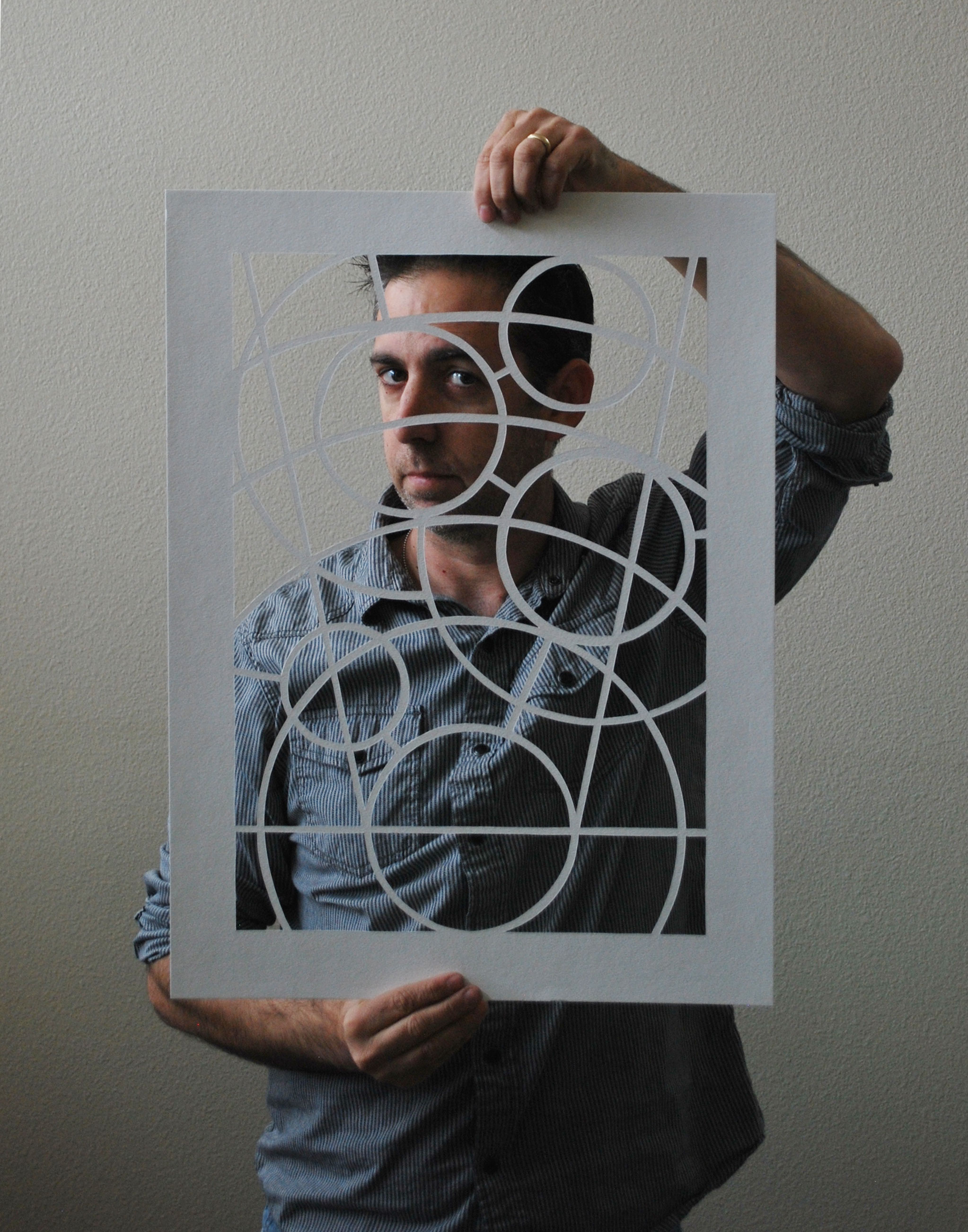
A portrait of the papercut artist Isaac Brynjegard-Bialik with an unfinished papercut

Brynjegard-Bialik is a contemporary Jewish artist whose papercut practice involves cutting up comic books and reassembling them into work exploring Jewish text and tradition.

Trained in graphic design, Brynjegard-Bialik started cutting paper while living in Jerusalem and first showed his work in a "Yom Yerushalayim" arts fair in Jerusalem. He has since shown work in galleries across the globe, and his work is in the hands of private collectors around the world. Brynjegard-Bialik's large commissions include "Tree of Life" for the chapel space at Children's Hospital Los Angeles and "To Boldly Go," presented to William Shatner on behalf of the Jewish Federation of Greater Portland.

== Uses ==
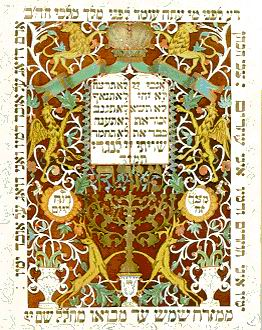
Mizrah papercut, Eastern Europe, 19th century

=== Types ===
Depending on their purpose, shape and connection with specific religious and non-religious events, paper cuts are of different types.

A Mizrah (hebr. The East) is a plaque hung on the east wall of private houses to show the direction of Jerusalem. A shivis’i (hebr. always) is similar to a mizrah, but it hangs on the east side of a synagogue. Its name is connected with a sentence from the Bible: 'Shivis'i adonai l'negdi tamid' ('I have set the LORD always before me'). Shivis’i in the form of paper cuts rather than some more durable material were only used in poor synagogues.

There were also various paper cuts made for special, religious celebrations. Shevuoslekh ("little Shavuots") and royzelekh (rosettes) decorated windows for Shavuot. Royzelekh are circle-shaped paper cuts, while Shevuoslekh are rectangular. They were often made by pupils in elementary Jewish religious schools (Cheders). They were sometimes decorated with motifs unconnected to religion, such as soldiers or riders.

Flags for Simchat-Torah were also made by cheder pupils. Created from colourful paper, each paper cut symbolized one of the twelve tribes of Israel. The other side of the paper showed an image of Torah with moving doors cut in paper. Paper cuts made for Sukkot were formed into lanterns, chains and birds, hung in Sukkahs.

Paper cuts often decorated a plaque with a prayer called Ushpizin, made for Sukkot. Paper cuts were also created for Purim, often containing the Hebrew sentence: "Mishenekhnas adar marbin b’simcha" ('We should rejoice because (the month of) Adar begins') and cut into an image of a bottle and glasses, a symbol of rejoicing.

Papercutting also has connections with other forms of Jewish tradition. For example, Ketubahs (marriage agreements) were sometimes prepared in the form of paper cut, or decorated with paper cutting elements. Also cut into paper, memorial plaques were made to commemorate the names of ancestors’ names and dates of birth and death. Lanterns with papercut walls were placed in synagogues for anniversaries of great men's death. Amulets like a Hamsa often showed an image of a palm with an eye on it.

== Characteristics ==
=== Features ===
Paper cuts traditionally were created with the use of shoemaker's knife. It is likely that most artists were men, though in later years, schoolgirls (and boys) made little rosettes (called royzelekh or reyzelekh in Yiddish) with scissors, to decorate their notebooks or for holiday decorations in the home. The artist first drew the pattern on a paper or parchment, and then cut it. Sometimes, they painted their work in watercolors. Paper cuts were usually glued to a contrasting background in a specific way, to bring the cut paper into relief. Hebrew sentences were important element of the composition. The words were either cut or drawn on paper. Elements of micrography, another traditional type of Jewish folk art, can be seen in these blocks of text created with the artist's knife. Due to Judaism's aniconism, it is rare to see a paper-cut from this period that depicts the human figure. Exceptions are Sephardic Ketubot depicting the bride and bridegroom.

=== Styles ===
Traditionally, paper cuts made by Sephardic and Ashkenazi Jews differed from each other. Ashkenazi papercuts were rich, highly detailed, and colourful. In this style, artists tried to fill the free space with as many elements as is possible. By contrast, the Sephardic compositions were more minimalist, including motifs such as the menorah, columns, arabesques and lanterns. Modern Jewish paper cut art is done in many styles and is not limited to the aforementioned symbols and motifs. They may be single-layered or multi-layered.

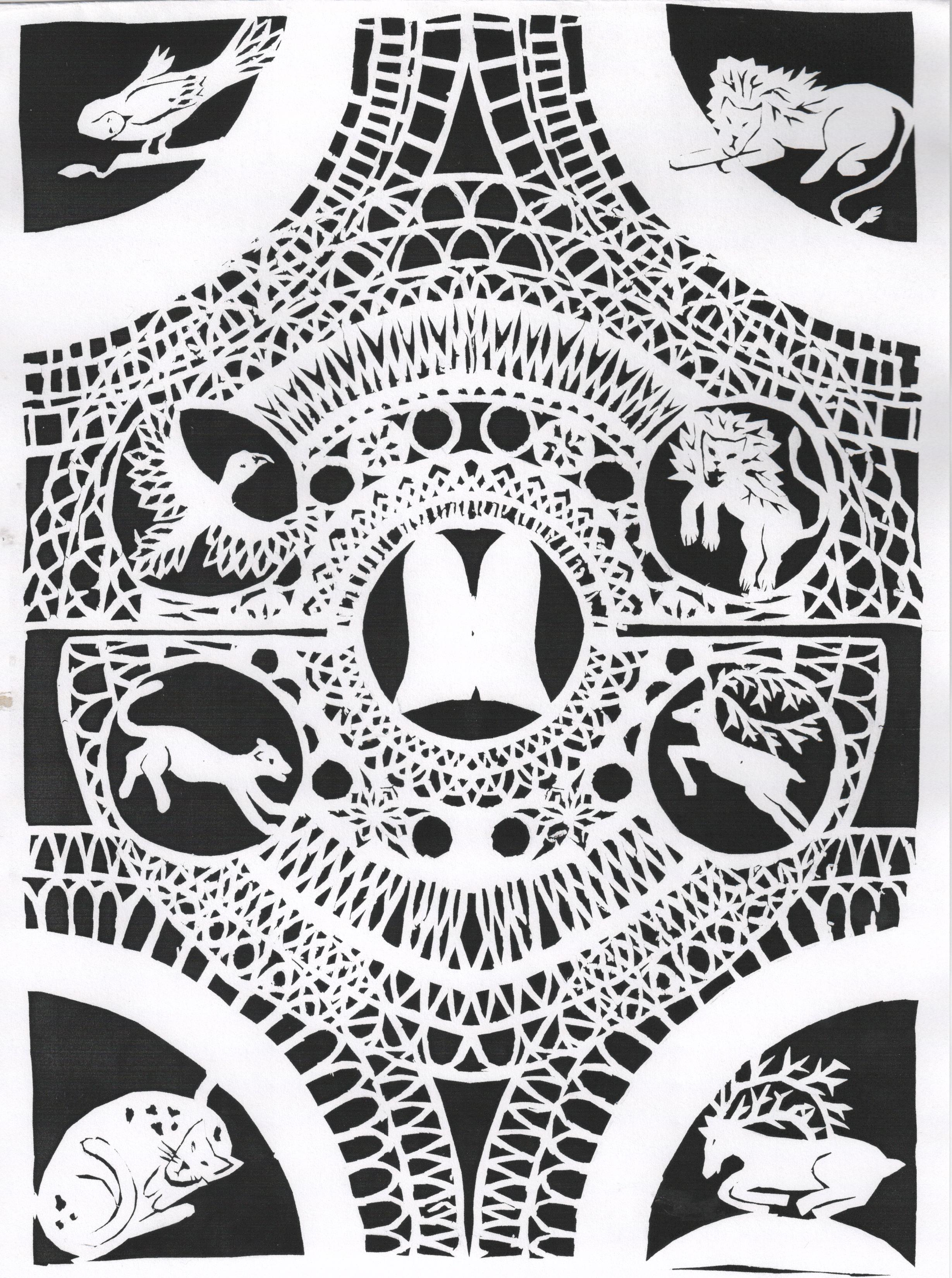
Jewish papercut "Four Animals" by Agata Szepe

=== Symbols ===
Every element of Jewish paper cut has its own symbolism. Some are typical of general Jewish culture, others are peculiar to the art of paper cutting. The most important symbols are placed along the axis of symmetry.

The main symbols are usually a Torah or a Menorah:

- The image of the Torah symbolizes God's law, Judaism, Israel. The Star of David symbolizes Judaism and Israel
- The Menorah symbolizes Israel, Judaism, and Temple in Jerusalem. The middle flame is a symbol of 'Shekinah' (Hebrew for God's presence); the other flames are shown as leaning towards the main flame. The bottom of the menorah is often shown as a complicated ornament symbolizing infinity

A range of animals are depicted in paper cuts:

- Lions, a biblical symbol of the Tribe of Judah, are associated with strength, bravery, power
- Deer symbolize the Tribe of Naphtali
- Birds are associated with the human soul
- Fish are usually connected with fertility
- A squirrel biting a nut symbolizes the effort put into reading the Torah
- The Four Animals (a leopard, an eagle, a gazelle, and a lion) are connected with a sentence from Pirkei Avot: "Be strong as the leopard, swift as the eagle, fleet as the gazelle, and brave as the lion to do the will of your Father in Heaven"
- A snake eating its own tail symbolizes infinity

Papercut flora is usually connected with the biblical Tree of Life, with some of the plants having their specific symbolism. For example, vine was associated with the land of Israel and with fertility, pomegranates symbolized fertility, etc.

Others symbols were connected both with tradition and with everyday life:

- Signs of the Zodiac showed the sequence of Jewish celebrations during the year
- Often positioned above the Torah or a Menorah, the crown is a symbol of God, the Torah, the Kingdom of Israel or the Priesthood
- Columns and other architectonic elements are associated with the Temple in Jerusalem
- Hands with joined thumbs are a gesture of blessing
- A jug filled with water and a bowl symbolize the Tribe of Levi, blessing or the Priesthood

== Methodology ==
The images are created by cutting a design into a folded piece of paper. When the paper is unfolded, the symmetrical design is revealed. The paper can be cut using either scissors or a craft knife.

== Gallery ==
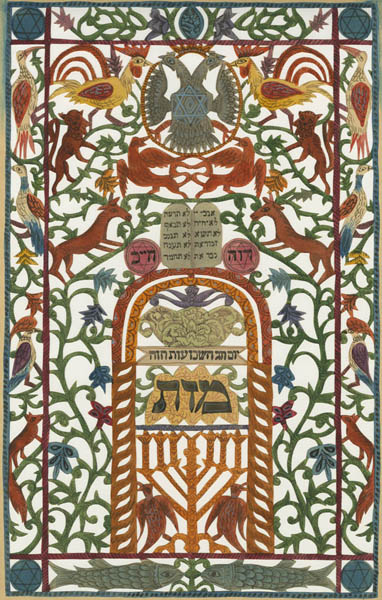
Shavuot papercut
early 20th century
Yeshiva University Museum

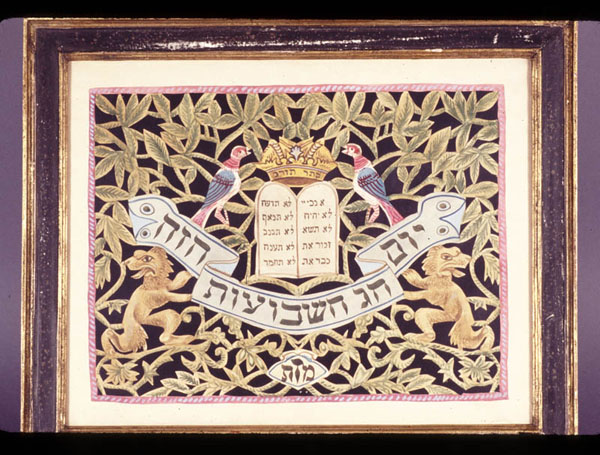
Shavuot papercut
undated
Poland
Yeshiva University Museum

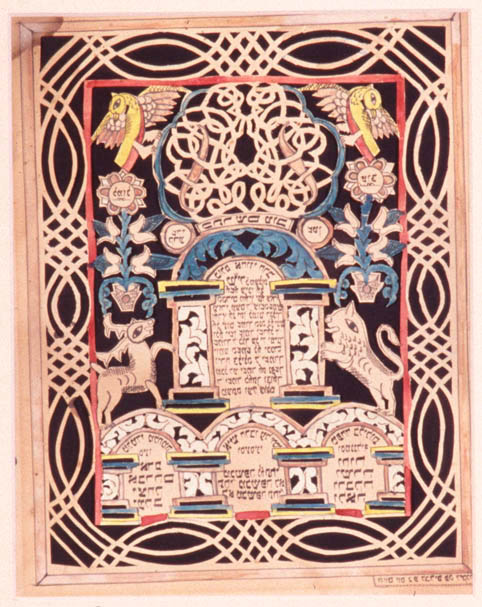
Shavuot papercut
David Elias Krieger
c. 1900
Yeshiva University Museum

== Works or publications ==
=== Books ===
- Błachowski, Aleksander (1986). Polska wycinanka ludowa / Polish Folk Cut-Out (in Polish). Toruń: Muzeum Etnograficzne w Toruniu. pp. 12–14. OCLC 247937563.
- Frankel, Giza פרנקל, גיזה; Harʼel-Ḥoshen, Śarah הראל שרה (1983). מגזרות נייר - אמנות יהודית עממית Migzerot neyar: Omanut Yehudit ʻamamit The Art of the Jewish Paper-Cut (in Hebrew). Ramat-Gan מסדה: Masadah. OCLC 27227163.
- Fränklowa, Giza (1929). Wycinanka żydowska w Polsce / Papierschnitte bei den Juden in Polen (in Polish). Lwów: Nakł. Towarzystwa Ludoznawczego. OCLC 802161157.
- Shadur, Joseph; Shadur, Yehudit (1994). Jewish Papercuts: A History and Guide. Jerusalem: Judah L. Magnes Museum (JLMM). ISBN 978-0-94-337654-7. OCLC 924825453.
- Shadur, Yehudit (1978). Paper-Cuts by Yehudit Shadur: March 12-May 7, 1978, Magnes Museum. Berkeley, CA: Magnes Museum. OCLC 44416264.
- Shadur, Joseph; Shadur, Yehudit; Sperber, Daniel (Forward); Gross, William L. (Preface) (2002). Traditional Jewish Papercuts: An Inner World of Art and Symbol. Hanover, NH: University Press of New England. ISBN 978-1-58-465165-9. OCLC 47625265.
- Shadur (שדור, יהודית), Yehudit; מוזיאון ארץ־ישראל / Muzeʼon Erets-Yiśraʼel / Eretz Israel Museum (1996). "Catalog of an exhibition held at Muzeʼon Erets Yiśraʼel as part of "Jerusalem 3000" celebration, winter 1995/96". ירושלים לדור ודור : מגזרות נייר / Yerushalayim le-dor ṿa-dor: Mi-gizrot neyar / Jerusalem from Generation to Generation (in Hebrew and English). Tel Aviv, Israel: מוזיאון ארץ־ישראל / Muzeʼon Erets-Yiśraʼel / Eretz Israel Museum. OCLC 38217079.
- Waletzky, Tsirl; Liebenbaum, Elaine (photographs) (6 August 2008). The Magic of Tsirl Waletzky.
- Waletzky, Tsirl; Hebrew Home for the Aged at Riverdale; Judaica Museum (1988). Contemporary Paper Cuts (January 10-June 26, 1988). New York: Judaica Museum. OCLC 42057827.
- Waletzky, Tsirl; Yeshiva University Museum (1977). Papercuts: A Contemporary Interpretation. "The Story of Ruth" exhibition. New York: Yeshiva University Museum. OCLC 2909376.

=== Online images ===
- Mizrah by Israel Dov Rosenbaum Podkamen, Ukraine, 1877 (date of inscription). Paint, ink, and pencil on cut-out paper. 30 1/4 x 20 3/4 in. (76.8 x 52.7 cm). The Jewish Museum, New York.
- Mizrah/Shiviti by Mordecai Reicher (American, b. Ukraine, 1865–1927). Brooklyn, New York, United States, 1921/22. Ink and watercolor on cut-out paper. 19 3/4 x 15 3/4 in. (50.2 x 40 cm). The Jewish Museum, New York.
- Memorial Calendar, Shiviti, and Mizrah by Hayyim Benjamin Blum, Mordecai Abraham. Poland, 19th century. Paint, pencil, and collage on cut-out paper. 21 7/8 x 21 3/4 in. (55.6 x 55.2 cm). The Jewish Museum, New York.

== See also ==
- Papercutting
- Chinese paper cutting
- Kurpie paper cutout
- Papel picado
- Scherenschnitte
- Vytynanky (Wycinanki)
- Silhouette
