= Kamikiri =

Kamikiri can refer to:

- Kamikiri (haircutting)
- Kamikiri (papercutting)
