= Tusif Ahmad =

Paper-cutting artist in Australia from Pakistan

- Born: Tusif Ahmad; 1968 July; Rawalpindi, Pakistan
- Known for: Calligraphy, painting, murals
- Movement: Islamic calligraphy, papercutting art
- Website: tusifahmad.com

Tusif Ahmad (born July 1968) is a Pakistani artist best known for his skills as a papercutting calligrapher. His work is notable for using and cutting a single piece of paper to depict Arabic calligraphy. He is recognized for his focus on depicting Islamic history and Quranic narratives. Ahmad has exhibited his work internationally, including in Australia, London, Cyprus, Abu Dhabi, and Pakistan.

== Early life ==
Ahmad was born in 1968 in Rawalpindi, Pakistan. He began his artistic training at the Rawalpindi Arts Council and was taught art by the prominent Pakistani artist Sadequain. He initially trained in traditional sketch mediums using pen and ink.

== Works ==
Ahmad's artwork takes a modern approach to traditional Islamic calligraphy and the Quranic stories in paper-cutting pieces. While his primary technique is cutting designs from a single piece of paper, he also produces large-scale laser-cut installations, which are permanently displayed at colleges such as the Australian Islamic College. He transitioned to papercutting as his primary medium following his migration to Australia in 2006. His long-term artistic focus is the comprehensive pictorial depiction of the Quran through paper-cutting artwork.

== Exhibitions and recognition ==
In 2018, Ahmad held a solo exhibition titled "Rekindling: Islamic Art" at the Lawrence Wilson Art Gallery, hosted in conjunction with the Centre for Muslim States and Societies at the University of Western Australia. In 2021, he was commissioned to design a custom permanent installation for the Army Museum of Western Australia.

Ahmad was funded by the Australian Federal Government's Department of Foreign Affairs and Trade (DFAT), securing a Council for Australian-Arab Relations (CAAR) grant for the "Rekindling: Islamic Art Project," leading a cultural exchange delegation to Morocco. Following this, he led professional training programs at the Lawrence Wilson Art Gallery at the University of Western Australia to disseminate traditional methodologies to the wider arts community.

He has showcased his work at various global academic and cultural institutions, including COMSATS University in Islamabad, Pakistan, and the Islamic Museum of Australia in Melbourne. His signature piece, The Doors of Heaven, is part of the permanent exhibition at the Islamic Museum of Australia.

Ahmad's papercut art was featured in the Terra Forma exhibition at the Gadfly Gallery in Perth, which received coverage in The West Australian. In 2017, his workshop programs were formally incorporated into the cultural and arts engagement strategies organized by the City of Perth.

=== Awards ===
- Winner, Open Category Award, Rockingham Art Awards (2018) – for his artwork Tree of Life, noted by judges for its "extraordinary craftsmanship".
- Finalist, Australian Muslim Achievement Awards (2022)
- 2nd Prize, Art for The Love of Muhammad (PBUH) in Islamic Arts Society, Houston
- Achievement Award, Pakistan Association of Western Australia in 2018

== See also ==
- Papercutting
- Islamic calligraphy
- Sadequain
