= Karen Bit Vejle =

Danish paper cutting artist

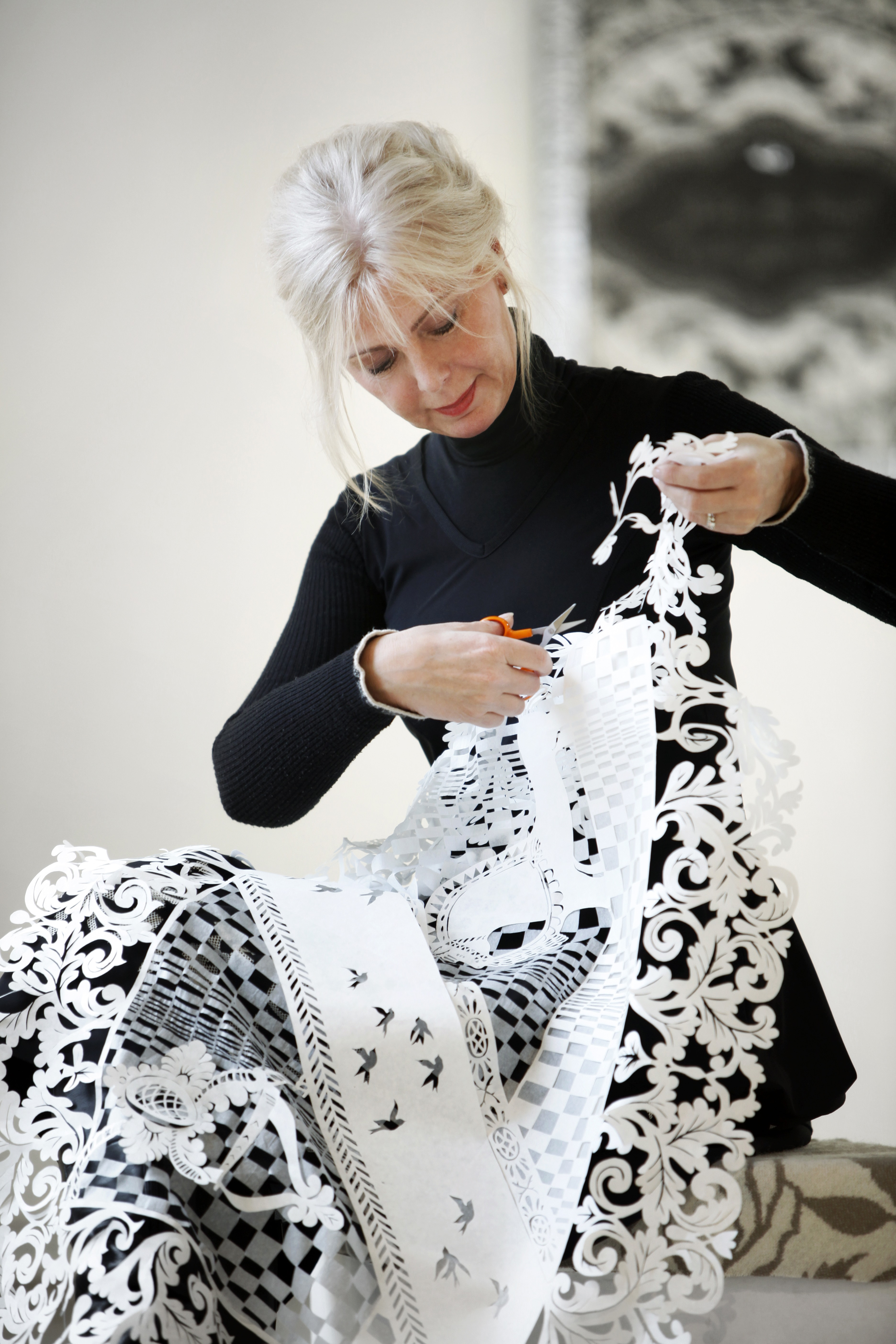
- Karen Bit Vejle at work with her art of paper and air. Marjana Malkamäki.

Karen Bit Vejle (born June 5, 1958 in Ejby, Denmark) is a Danish papercut artist. She lived in Trondheim, Norway from 1984 to 2014, and currently lives in Denmark.

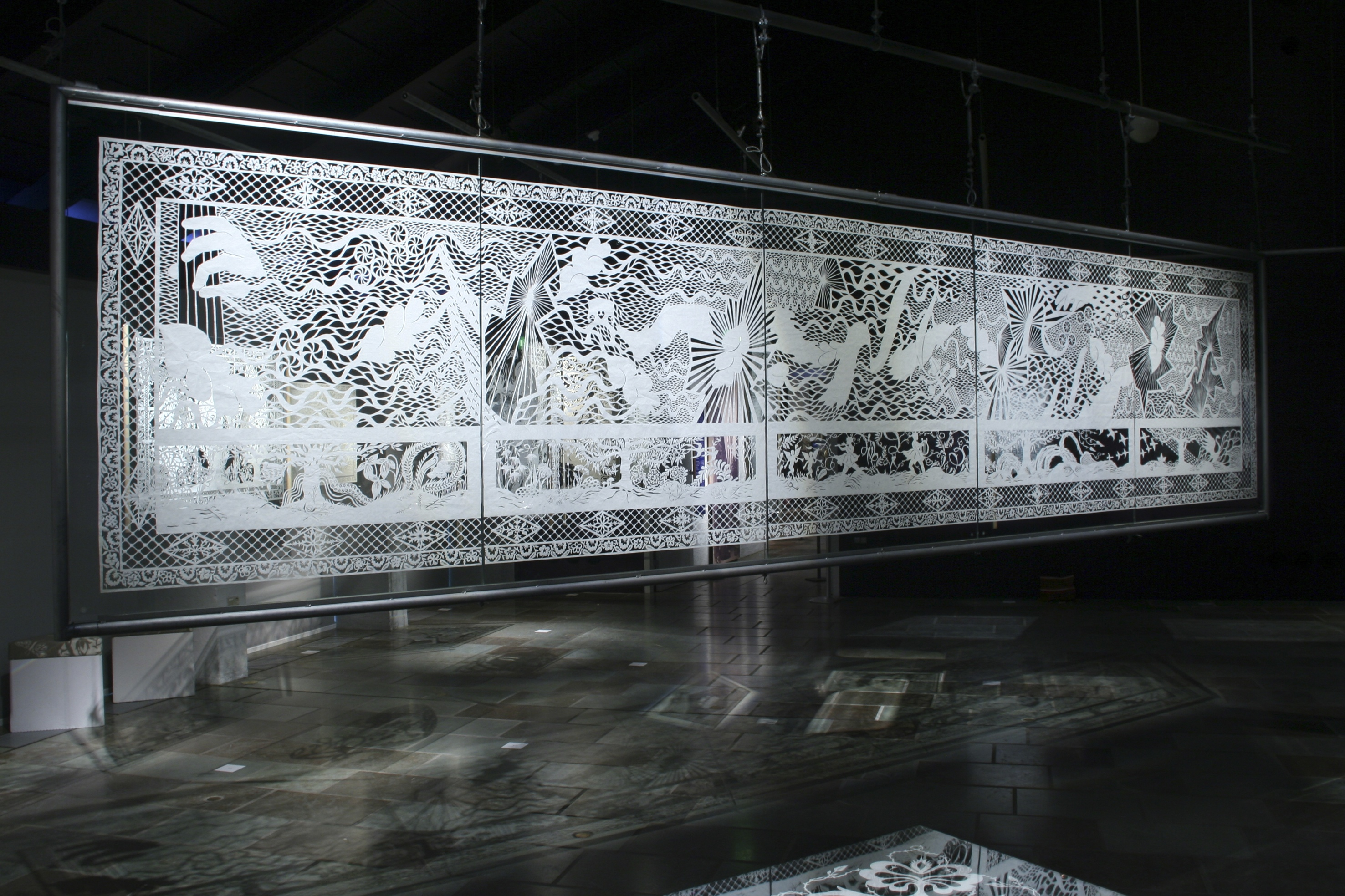
Vejle's work Sjostakovitsj' 1. pianotrio opus 8, 5 m x 1.05 m. Commissioned work for the Winter Festival Games in Bergstaden, 2008. Helle S. Andersen.

== Work and philosophy ==
Vejle's primary art form is papercutting, the art of creating images made of paper by cutting patterns and pictures. She carries on a tradition from, among others, the Danish fairy-tale writer H.C. Andersen, and a technique that was important in the 1700s for silhouette portraiture. Papercut art is made from large sheets of paper and cut only with scissors. The work of creating this type of art is time-intensive and requires great concentration; a wrong cut cannot be undone.

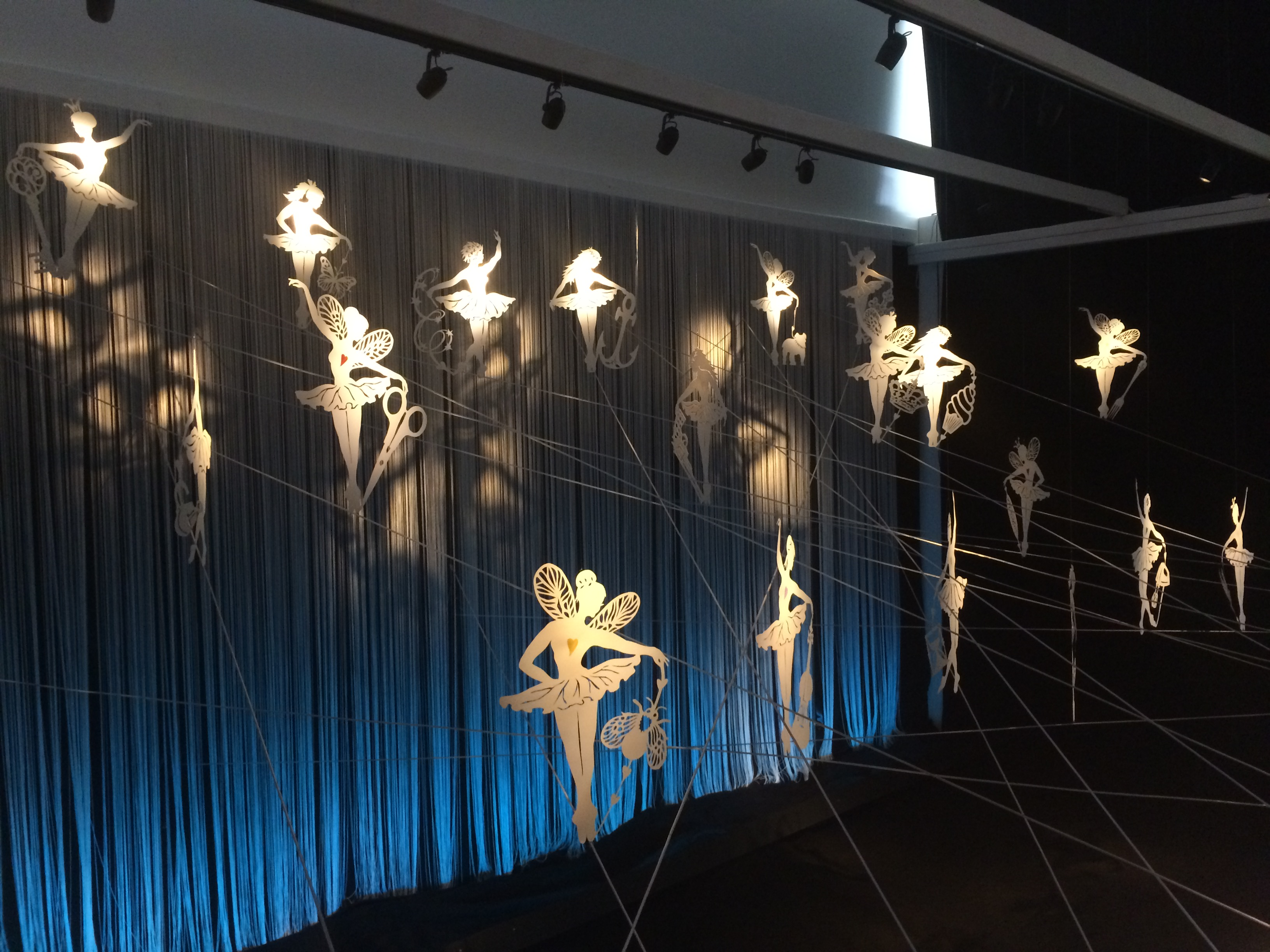
Ballerina Bulldog exhibited by Jamtli in Östersund, May 2015. Kj. Lie.

An important figure in Vejle's artwork is "Ballerina Bulldog," an apparently delicate, but strong, ballerina. The aim of the Ballerina Bulldog concept is to provoke reflection on one's own inner strength, and increase awareness of the responsibility one has for one's own life choices. The concept is based on Søren Kierkegaard's philosophy:

The Danish philosopher Søren Kierkegaard has said that when we walk the path of life, we come to a point where it splits in two. We have to choose, and then we move on. And when we have gone a little way, the road splits again and we can make a new and perhaps wiser choice. That is the wonderful thing.

— Karen Bit Vejle to Bergens Tidende

She also creates template paintings, cutting images from one piece of paper and transferring them by painting on a second sheet (stenciling).

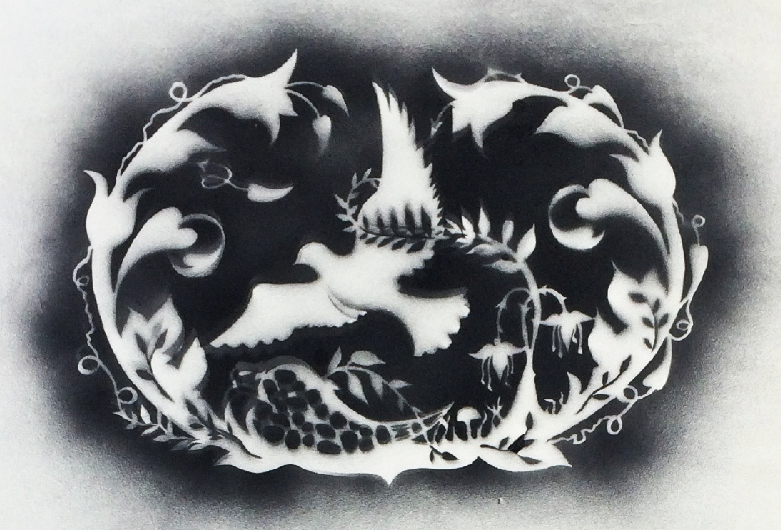
Template painting by Karen Bit Vejle.

== Career ==
Vejle has had installations and shows in Scandinavia, Europe, Asia and the United States. The well-known London gallery Adrian Sassoon is the main seller of her art. The American Swedish Institute in Minneapolis exhibited 54 of her paper creations in a 2016 show called Papercut! The Incredible Psaligraphy of Karen Bit Vejle.

In 2010 she began an artistic collaboration, "Paper dialogues," with the Chinese papercut artist Xiaoguan Qiao. Both Vejle and Qiao created work depicted dragons; as Qiao put it, the "dragon’s meaning as a symbol differs depending on the culture that views it." The collaboration resulted in an exhibit that was shown in many countries around the world.

Vejle is the subject of a documentary by Norwegian filmmaker Gry Molvær Hivju, "Bit Ballerina Bulldog", that was nominated for Best Documentary of the Year at the 2015 Bergen International Film Festival (BIFF), and nominated for Best Movie Music for the Norwegian Broadcast Industry's Golden Screen award.
