= Virgilijus Trakimavičius =

Lithuanian artist

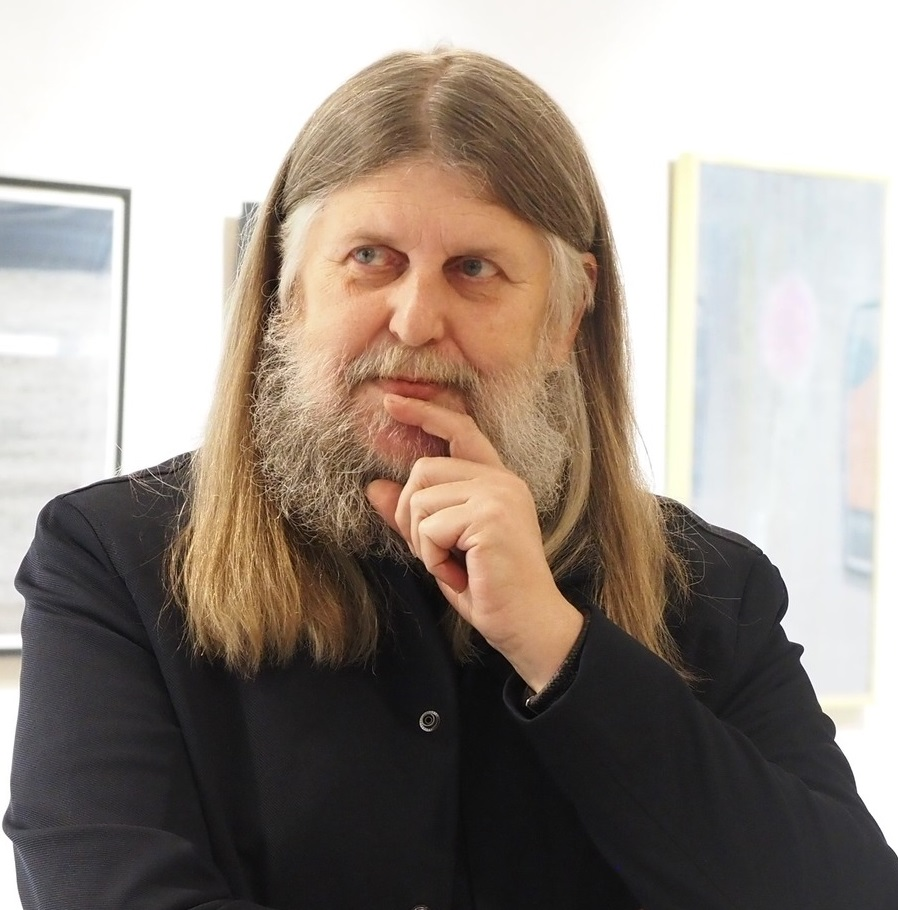
- Born: 6 August 1958 (age 66); Kaunas, Lithuania
- Known for: Graphic Design
- Website: trakimavicius.com

Virgilijus Trakimavičius (born 1958 in Kaunas) is a Lithuanian graphic designer and a professor at the Vilnius Academy of Arts.

== Early life and education ==
Trakimavičius was born August 6, 1958, in Kaunas and attended the Kaunas J. Naujalis School of Arts. In 1983, he graduated from Vilnius Academy of Arts, where he studied design.

== Career ==
In 1994, Trakimavičius began lecturing at the Kaunas Faculty of Design of the Vilnius Academy of Arts. He became a docent in 2003 and a professor in 2013, at which point he became the head of the Kaunas Faculty of Design.

Beyond academia, Virgilijus is a paper cutting and a grattage artist. His works have been displayed in numerous exhibitions, contests, and art workshops both in Lithuania and abroad.

He is also a member of the International Council of Design, the Lithuanian Graphic Design Association, and the Lithuanian Artists' Association.
