= Chinese paper cutting =

Art of paper cutting in China

Chinese paper-cut
- UNESCO Intangible Cultural Heritage
- Country: China
- Reference: 219
- Region: Asia-Pacific region

Inscription history
- Inscription: 2009 (4th session)
- List: Representative
- UNESCO Cultural Heritage

Chinese paper cutting
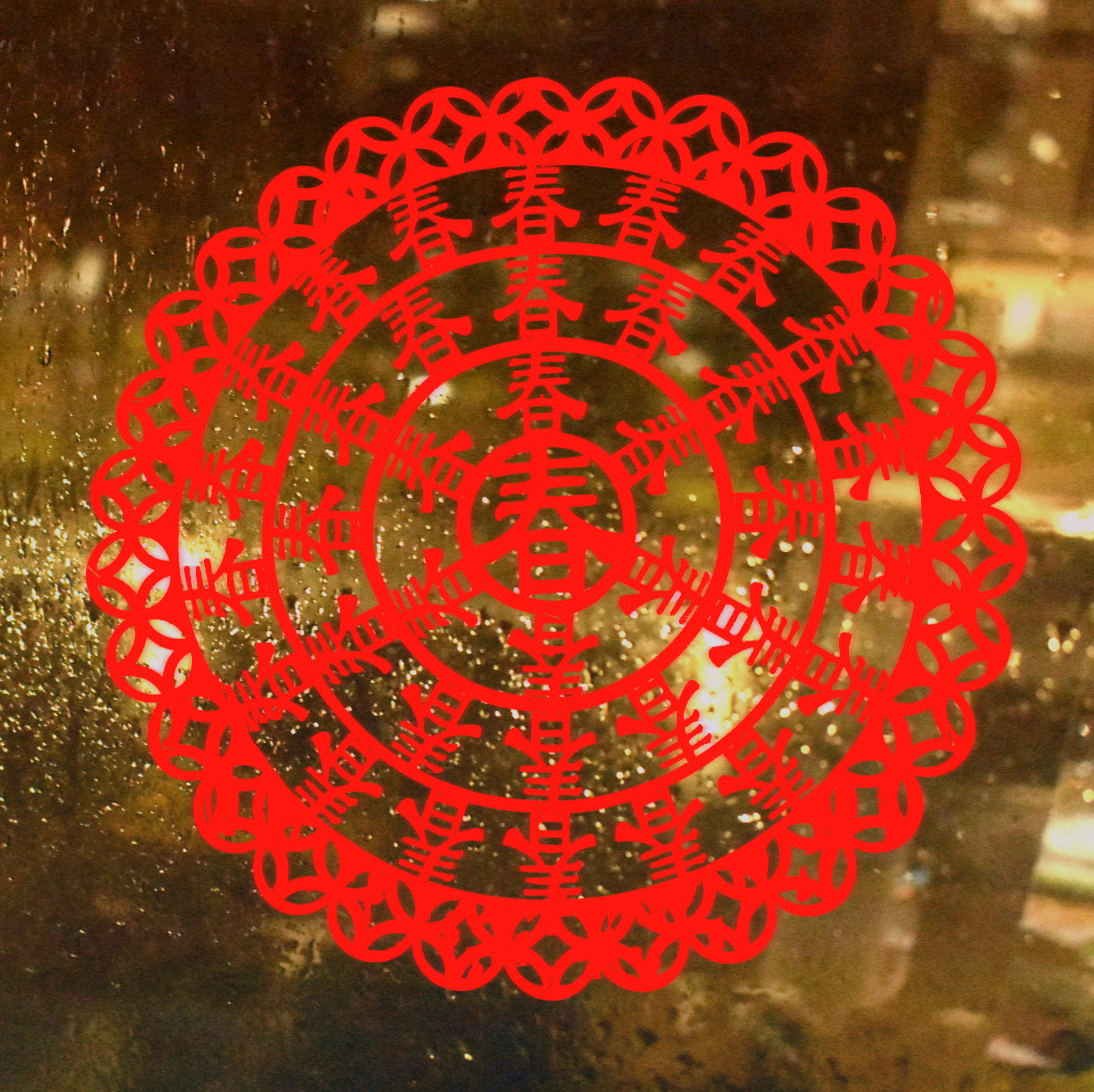
- Paper cutting with the symbol for Spring (春)
- Traditional Chinese: 剪紙
- Simplified Chinese: 剪纸
Transcriptions
Standard Mandarin
- Hanyu Pinyin: Jiǎnzhǐ

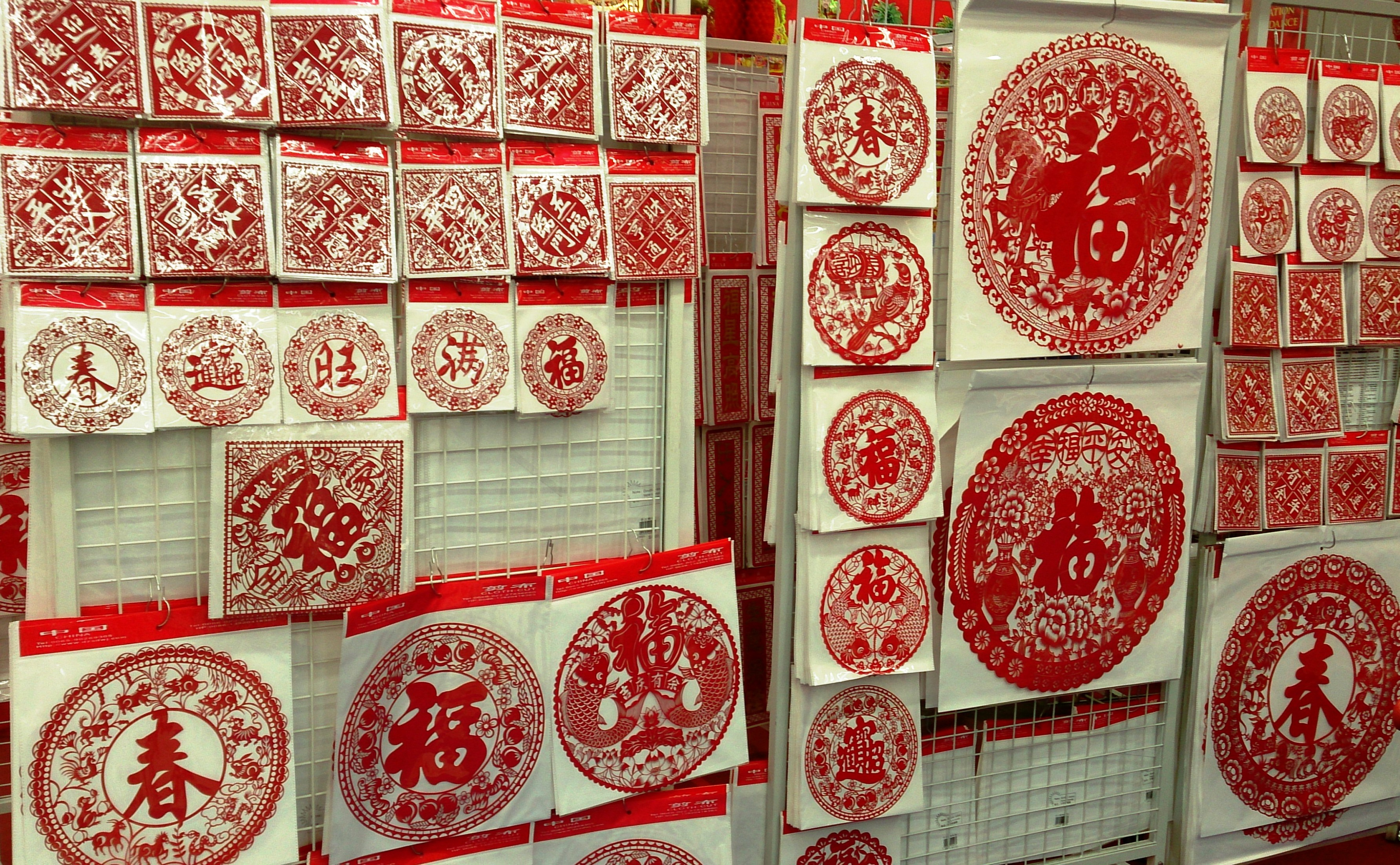
Chinese paper cuttings in a shop.

The traditional art of paper cutting (Chinese: 剪紙; pinyin: jiǎnzhǐ) in China may date back to the 2nd century CE, when paper was invented by Cai Lun, a court official of the Eastern Han dynasty. On May 20, 2006, paper cutting has been officially listed as one of the earliest intangible cultural heritages of China, issue by Shanxi Culture Department. It was put on the UNESCO Representative List of the Intangible Cultural Heritage of Humanity in 2009.

Prior to the invention of paper, ancient Chinese people used silver and gold leaf to create similar kinds of cut out decorations. As paper became more accessible, paper cutting became popular as a way of decorating doors and windows. These elaborate cutting designs are created with scissors or artwork knives and can include a variety of shapes, such as symbols and animals. When paper became more affordable in Eastern Han dynasty, paper-cutting became one of the most important types of Chinese folk art. Later, this art form spread to other parts of the world, with different regions adopting their own cultural styles.

Since the cut-outs are often used to decorate doors and windows, most paper cuts are called "huā", which means "flower" in Mandarin. "Flower" in this term refers to the meaning of pattern instead of the botanic beauty. The paper cut outs used to decorate windows are called "window flowers" (窗花; chuāng huā). whilst those used as stencils for embroidery are called "hat flower" (帽花; mào huā), "pillow flower" (枕花; zhěn huā), or "shoe flower" (鞋花; xié huā).

Usually, the artworks are made of red paper, as red is associated with festivities and luck in Chinese culture, but other colours are also used.

Normally cut-paper artwork is used on festivals such as Chinese New Year, weddings and childbirth, as cut-paper artwork is considered to symbolize luck and happiness.

== Origin ==
Chinese paper-cutting originated from the practice of worship of both ancestors and Gods, a traditional part of Chinese culture dating back roughly two millennia. According to archaeological records, paper-cutting originates from the 6th century, although some believe that its history could be traced back as far as the Warring States period (around 3 BC), long before paper was invented.

At that time, people used other thin materials, like leaves, silver foil, silk and leather, to carve negative-space patterns. The techniques for cutting and carving were developed before the invention of paper. Currently, the earliest example of a paper cut-out was found in 1959 from a gravesite in Xinjiang region, dating back to the year AD 386 - 581. Later when paper was invented by Cai Lun in the year AD 105, people realized that this material was easy to cut, store and discard, so paper became the main material for this type of artwork.

=== Tang dynasty ===
During the Tang dynasty, paper cutting developed rapidly and became popular in China, which typically combined paper cutting with painting to illustrate spiritual ideas. Paper-cutting as an artform matured during the Tang dynasty, where it became considered not only a type of decorative handicraft, but also a type of artwork, as ideas and concepts were expressed through the pattern cut into the paper.

=== Song dynasty ===
During the Song dynasty, Chinese papercutting developed into a more advanced technique, with trained artisans creating more complex artworks. The technique was used to decorate ceramics and make shadow puppets. By carving patterns onto oily cardboard and scraping patterns onto the fabric, blue-printed fabric became a popular medium.

=== Ming and Qing dynasties ===
In the Ming and Qing dynasty (1368-1912), paper-cutting reached a developmental peak and became a more popular Chinese art. Folk paper-cutting spread to a wider range of people and expressed an abundance of artistic expression. It developed a variety of uses, including lantern and fan ornaments, needlework patterns, and window flowers. Paper-cutting was used to decorate doors, windows, and walls, to show happiness and celebrate festivals. The imperial family also utilized papercutting, with the Forbidden City decorated with papercuts during the emperor's wedding ceremony. Its continual appeal reflects the Chinese people's creativity, with designs expressing cultural ideas and values.

This artistry witnessed its most prosperous period in Ming and Qing dynasties. For over a thousand years, people (predominantly women) created cut-paper artworks as a leisure activity, creating different types of paper-cutting and passing this traditional craft onto their children, resulting in the art form maintaining cultural relevancy throughout generations. Paper-cutting is still practiced as an art form in modern-day China as a result.

As a material, paper mildews and rots easily. In the southeast of China, where it typically rains in May and June, this causes paper to mildew and rot especially quickly. As a result, people in the southeast typically did not engage in paper-cutting art, making it hard to find cut-paper artworks from previous centuries. In contrast, the weather in the northwest of China is usually dry, making it possible to find preserved cut-paper art made in the Northern dynasties in Turpan, Sinkiang province.

== Style Classification ==
Paper-cutting is one of the oldest and the most popular folk arts in China. It can be geographically divided into three main schools.

Representative of South School Paper Cutting - Pig

=== South School (南方剪纸 nán fāng jiǎn zhǐ) ===
The south school, represented by works from Foshan in Guangdong Province and Fujian Province, features rigorous, decorative and elegant designs. It is varied in its theme choice, among which the gift flowers of Putian are the best known pattern of the South School.

Zhangpu paper-cutting originated in Fujian Province, China, and is famous for its fine craftsmanship and vivid composition. It combines cutting, engraving, pasting, painting and other techniques, and the works are rich in layers and punch a strong visual impact. Common subjects include auspicious motifs, folklore and natural scenes, often in bright colors and dynamic shapes.

=== Jiangzhe School (江浙剪纸 jiāng zhè jiǎn zhǐ) ===
The Jiangzhe School is originated from the Jiangsu and Zhejiang provinces in Eastern China. Representative works from Yangzhou in Jiangsu Province and Yueqing in Zhejiang Province feature ingenious and beautiful designs, exquisite carving and interesting shapes. The style originating in this school is the most famous internationally. It usually depicts nature-related themes like flowers, birds, fish and fruits.

=== North School (北方剪纸 běi fāng jiǎn zhǐ) ===
The northern style, mainly from Yuxian and Fengning in Hebei Province, and best represented in works from northern Shaanxi, features exaggerated shapes, vivid depictions and diverse patterns. The style tend to have a relatively simple and symmetrical design, focusing on abstract shapes, animals and patterns.

Yuxian paper-cutting, produced in Hebei province, China, is famous for its color printing techniques and bold and unrestrained style. Artists first cut out complex patterns, and then hand color layer by layer, so that the color of the picture is bright and strong contrast. Most of the subjects are opera figures, folk stories and festival scenes, showing a strong northern folk culture.

=== Minority School ===
Miao paper-cutting originated in the southeast of Guizhou Province and is a common base in Miao traditional embroidery. The Miao are one of the 55 officially recognized ethnic minority groups in China. Theirucut out papercrafts are sed to decorate Windowi, but instead as a stencil for embroidery The .contents of the paper cuts are mostly from taken oral legends, such as figures, animals and flowers. Miao Paper-cutting artists usually create based on stories, and the patterns pay attention to hierarchy and layout, which is an expression of Miao culture and memory.

== Characteristics ==
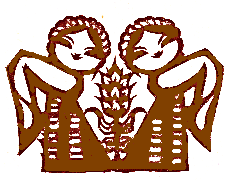
A symmetrical cut

Chinese paper cutting is an art form from the Chinese cultural legacy that displays a wide range of designs, from basic designs consisting of a single image to symmetrical designs which are created by folding the paper into proportionate, equal portions before cutting, so that when unfolded, it forms a mirrored design. Typically, the designs are freeform and depict scenes from there daily life.

Red paper is the most prevalent because it is connected with happiness and good fortune in Chinese culture, but it is not limited to any one color. Two main styles of paper cutting are single-color and multi-color. Paper cutting is consistently evolving and has developed beyond China, with artists developing new techniques and materials to keep this art form alive.

== Uses and Functions ==
=== Decorative use ===
Chinese papercutting is mostly used for decoration nowadays. Many Chinese people decorate their windows with paper cuttings to express enthusiasm for the new season or new year. Paper cuttings are also used in homes to decorate walls, doors, lamps, and lanterns and are often presented as gifts. Furthermore, paper cuttings pasted near entrances symbolize good luck. This traditional habit festively decorates houses and special occasions. They liven up walls, windows, doors, columns, mirrors, lamps and lanterns in homes and are also used on presents or are given as gifts themselves. Paper cut-outs pasted on or near entrances are supposed to bring good luck. Cut-paper artworks are used by young people as a decoration for their kits and books.

Paper-cutting was and is mostly used as a decoration, or an aesthetic way to express people's hopes, gratitude and other emotions. The vivid designs depicted on paper-cuttings have different meanings. Some express wishes for a good harvest or a wealthy life, shown through the imagery of a golden harvest, thriving domestic animals and plants, as well as good fortunes, a carp jumping over a dragon gate (a traditional Chinese story, indicating a leap towards a better life), polecats, lions, qilins (a mythical Chinese creature), jade rabbits (an animal taken from Chinese legend), pomegranates and peonies. Other designs feature legendary figures, or scenes from traditional myths or stories, such as designs of the Yellow Emperor, the meeting of Cowherd and Weaver Girl, and the 24 stories of filial piety. Designs may also show people's gratitude towards life, such as paper-cuttings of a doll with two braids on each side of the head, or fish swimming through lotus plants.

=== Symbolic use ===
The symbolic language of Chinese paper-cutting is deeply rooted in traditional culture. People use Chinese characters as expressive symbols in paper-cutting. The most popular paper-cutting characters are 福 (meaning 'lucky') and 囍; xǐ (meaning 'double happiness'), which are respectively used in the context of Chinese New Year celebrations and weddings.

Under the influence of Daoism culture, the pattern of paper-cutting is also related to nature and cosmology. Circular motifs known as tuánhuā (团花), often featuring symmetrical floral or geometric patterns, embody the Daoist principle of Yin-Yang balance and symbolize cosmic harmony and wholeness. Lunar calendar traditions are reflected in zodiac animal paper-cuts, where the twelve earthly branches (十二生肖, shí'èr shēngxiào) serve both as decorative elements and markers of cyclical time.

=== Spiritual use ===
Chinese paper cuttings' designs are often used to express hopes, appreciation, and other spiritual emotions. Common Chinese papercutting motifs include representations of harvests, animals, and mythical stories such as the carp jumping over the dragon gate. Chinese people express cultural heritage, values, and beliefs through the art of papercutting, making it a significant element of their spiritual expression.

Window paper-cuttings have a close relationship with the beginning of spring, and it is traditional to decorate windows with paper-cuttings to welcome spring. In many areas of China, especially in the north, paper-cuttings are pasted to windows to express happiness for the new season, a tradition that has been practiced since the Song and Yuan dynasties. Some people also believed that window paper-cutting can be a way of bringing better luck by changing the geomancy of a house.

=== Educational use ===
Chinese papercutting has educational uses that teach children about traditional Chinese art and culture and the beauty of papercutting while learning Chinese papercutting history. Practicing paper cuts also helps children enhance their fine motor skills, hand-eye coordination, cutting and creativity.

In many special education schools in China, paper cutting has become an important tool in the art education of deaf students. The tactile and visual nature of paper-cutting enables students to express emotions and convey meanings through non-verbal means, which not only inherits skills, but also plays a role in psychological healing.

Incorporating paper cutting art into international Chinese education in colleges and universities can enhance the understanding and recognition of Chinese culture for international students. Through this cultural heritage art form, teachers can mix language and culture, improve the effect of Chinese teaching, and realize the organic integration of language education and traditional culture inheritance.

=== Entertainment use ===
Chinese paper-cutting played a pivotal role in the development of shadow puppetry (皮影戏, píyǐngxì), a popular theatrical entertainment that flourished until the early 20th century. Artists crafted paper-cutting figures representing dramatic characters, which were then stuck to bamboo sticks for manipulation. However, since paper is hard to preserve over long time, these paper figures were eventually replaced by leather.

=== Modern use ===
Modern Chinese paper-cutting has evolved beyond traditional folk motifs, with artists integrating avant-garde concepts and mixed media. Notable artist Lü Shengzhong (吕胜中) redefined the art form through large-scale installations incorporating abstract human figures (called "Little Red Men"), exploring themes of cultural identity and globalization. From 1990 to 2003, his works began to be frequently exhibited overseas in the form of paper cuttings. Chinese paper-cutting has spread throughout the globe during the 1990s period. In the 2000s, Yan’an paper-cuts were mass-produced by trained rural women and featured in major exhibitions such as the Shanghai Biennale (2004), Taiwan Art Biennial (2004), Vancouver Art Gallery (2005), and São Paulo Biennale (2007).

In 2009, Chinese paper cutting is officially added to the UNESCO Representative List of the Intangible Cultural Heritage of Humanity.

Today, paper-cutting has been widely adopted in branding and product design. During the 2008 Beijing Olympics, stylized paper-cut patterns depicting sporting events adorned official merchandise and venue decorations, symbolizing cultural heritage.

Contemporary social media allow audiences to participate in the creation and dissemination of artworks. Livestreaming, for example, offers paper cutters and audiences the ability to affect each other in real time. During a live stream of a paper artwork being constructed, the audience might suggest that the artist incorporate characters from popular culture, such as Bing Dwen-dwen (the mascot of 2022 winter Beijing Olympics), Nezha, or Pikachu.I.

=== Social Functions ===
Several provincial governments and cultural institutions in China have initiated digital archiving projects for preserving regional paper-cutting styles. These initiatives involve scanning historical works, recording oral histories from folk artists, and developing online databases. Such digitization not only prevents the loss of intangible heritage but also enhances accessibility for researchers and educators worldwide.

In rural areas of Chinese provinces, traditional paper-cutting is becoming a means to empower women and promote rural economic development. Many cooperatives offer training courses in paper-cutting skills so that women can earn income by creating works while passing on culture. This model reflects the important role of intangible cultural heritage in sustainable rural development.

In recent years, China has launched a series of national intangible cultural heritage training programs to enhance the professional ability and social responsibility of paper-cutting inheritors. Taking the "paper cutting" workshop held in Inner Mongolia in 2022 as an example, the students received diversified courses such as theoretical teaching, practical operation, visit and exchange during the one-month training, which not only improved their technical level and aesthetic ability, but also enhanced their understanding of the non-hereditary mission. Such projects not only promote the creative transformation of paper cutting, but also strengthen public participation and cultural identity, reflecting the positive function of paper cutting art in contemporary society.

Paper cutting has increasingly become a highlight of intangible cultural heritage tourism in regions such as Shanxi. Scenic spots host live paper-cutting demonstrations and workshops, attracting both domestic and international tourists. These immersive experiences strengthen cultural identity while promoting cultural consumption.

As a traditional Chinese folk art, paper cutting not only carries emotional expression and cultural symbol, but also has a certain healing function. The creative process can help the creator to relieve pressure and promote self-cognition. Modern research suggests that paper cutting can stimulate the secretion of dopamine and endorphins, bringing a sense of calm and pleasure. The combination of paper-cutting and immersive installation art is more helpful to expand the application scene of psychological healing, and become a creative and acceptable way of physical and mental adjustment in modern society.

Chinese paper cutting has been exhibited many times in important international cultural activities such as the United Nations Chinese Language Day, showing traditional Chinese art to a global audience. These activities not only show the exquisite skills and rich cultural significance of paper cutting, but also let more foreign friends understand and love this traditional folk art. Through such cultural exchanges, Chinese paper cutting has won attention and recognition overseas, and has also enhanced the communication power and influence of Chinese culture in the world.

Chinese paper-cut animation is a combination of traditional paper-cut art animation form, the picture is unique, rich national characteristics. It was widely loved in the early days, but due to the complexity and inefficiency of production, it was gradually replaced by other forms of animation. Now, some researchers try to use digital technology to make paper-cut animation, hoping to improve the production efficiency on the basis of retaining the traditional style, so that this animation form with Chinese characteristics can be revitalized and better enter the vision of modern audiences.

== Construction methods ==
There are two methods of manufacturing Chinese paper-cuttings: one method uses scissors, the other a sharp knife. The construction methods of papercutting involve several steps, including the selection of paper materials, specifically types and colors depending on the desired effect. The selected paper is then folded multiple times, and the pattern is drawn onto it. Next, cut the design out carefully, either with scissors or an art knife. Finally, the paper cutout is opened up to reveal the exquisite design, which can be further enhanced with additional details such as coloring and shading. The construction of papercutting requires patience, skill, and carefulness, as well as the creativity and artistry of artists.

The application of Chinese paper cutting art in the design of cultural and creative products broadens the spread and form of this kind of traditional art. By applying paper-cut designs to things like desk calendars, bookmarks, and souvenirs, artists give the cultural meaning into these objects that can be used in daily life, enhancing their aesthetic value and market appeal.

Based on traditional Chinese paper cutting, Chinese researchers have developed a new technique called "nano-paper cutting" in 2017. This new paper cutting technology can use complex nanostructures to make Chinese paper cutting products. The research result has a promising application in high-tech fields, and also shows that traditional art can also bring new breakthroughs in science.

=== Scissor construction method ===
The scissor construction approach involves taping multiple sheets of paper together and then cutting off the designated shapes using sharp scissors. Several pieces of paper – up to eight – are fastened together, before the motif is then cut with sharp, pointed scissors. Chinese paper-cutting involves cutting intricate, exquisite designs from a single or multiple layers of paper with scissors or artwork knives. It is passed down through generations because both procedures demand a great deal of talent and skills. This cutting of multiple paper layers at the same time enables a more consistent pattern.

=== Knife construction method ===
In the artwork knife construction approach, the design is carved out with a sharp knife, commonly following a pattern, but expert artisans can alternatively cut varied shapes freely. In the knife method, several layers of paper are placed on a relatively soft foundation, consisting of a mixture of tallow and ashes. Following a pattern, the motifs are then cut into the paper with a sharp knife, which is usually held vertically. Skilled artisans can cut different designs freehand, without following a pattern.

== See also ==
- Chinese art
- Chinese folk art
- Chinese paper folding
- Kirigami
- Kurpie paper cutout
- Leaf carving
- Papercutting
- Scherenschnitte
- Wycinanki
- Papel picado

== Bibliography ==
- Zhang Shuxian. Chinese Folk Paper-cutting[J]. China Today (Chinese version), 2005,(05)
- Zhuang Zhiyun. Folk Paper-cutting[J]. Chuang Zuo Ping Tan, 2006,(02)
- Wu, F. A glimpse of Chinese culture through papercuts [Press release], (2004, season-01)
- Wu, Hung. Contemporary Chinese Art: A Critical History. Thames & Hudson, 2012, ISBN 978-0500239015.
