= Papercutting =

Art of paper designs

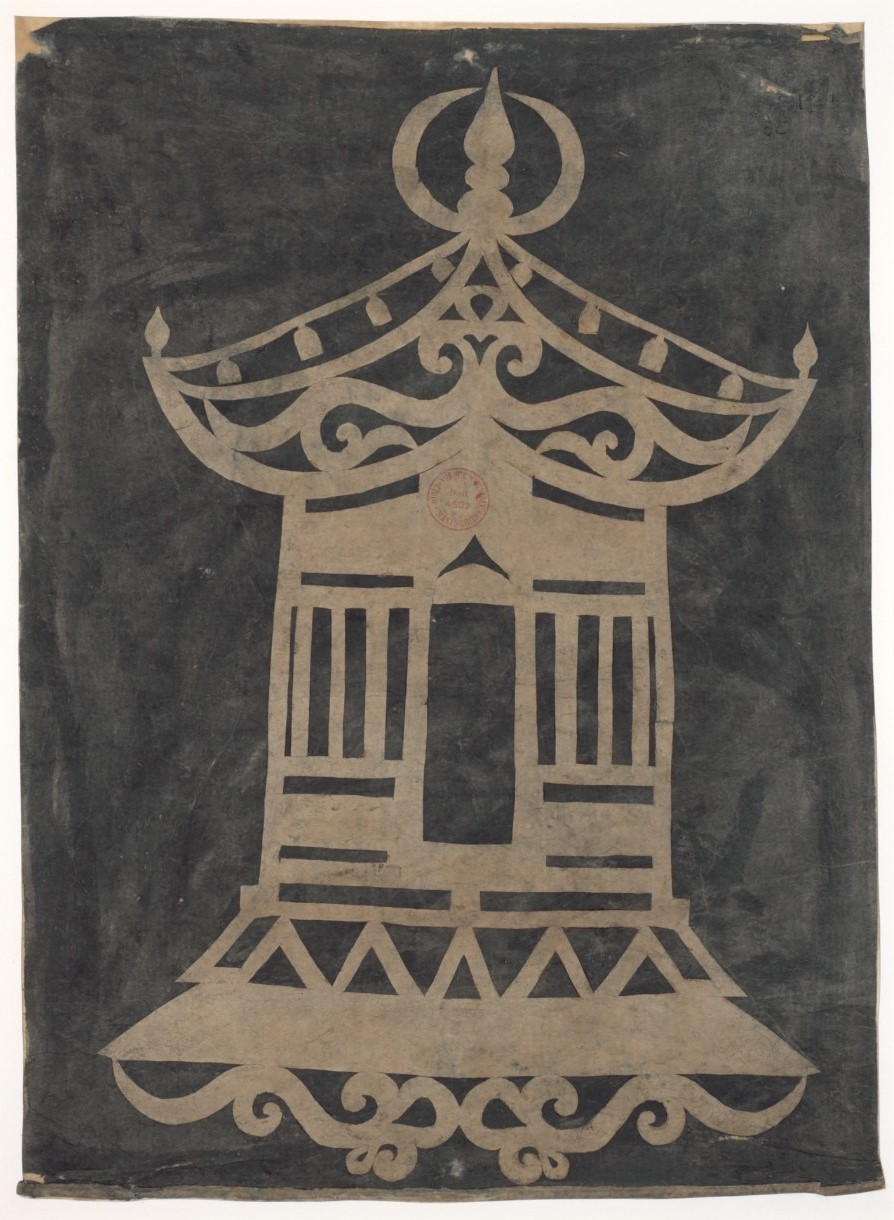
Paper-cut with stupa. One of the earliest known papercuts, this specimen was recovered by Paul Pelliot in the Dunhuang grotto and is dated to the tenth century. Bibliothèque nationale de France.

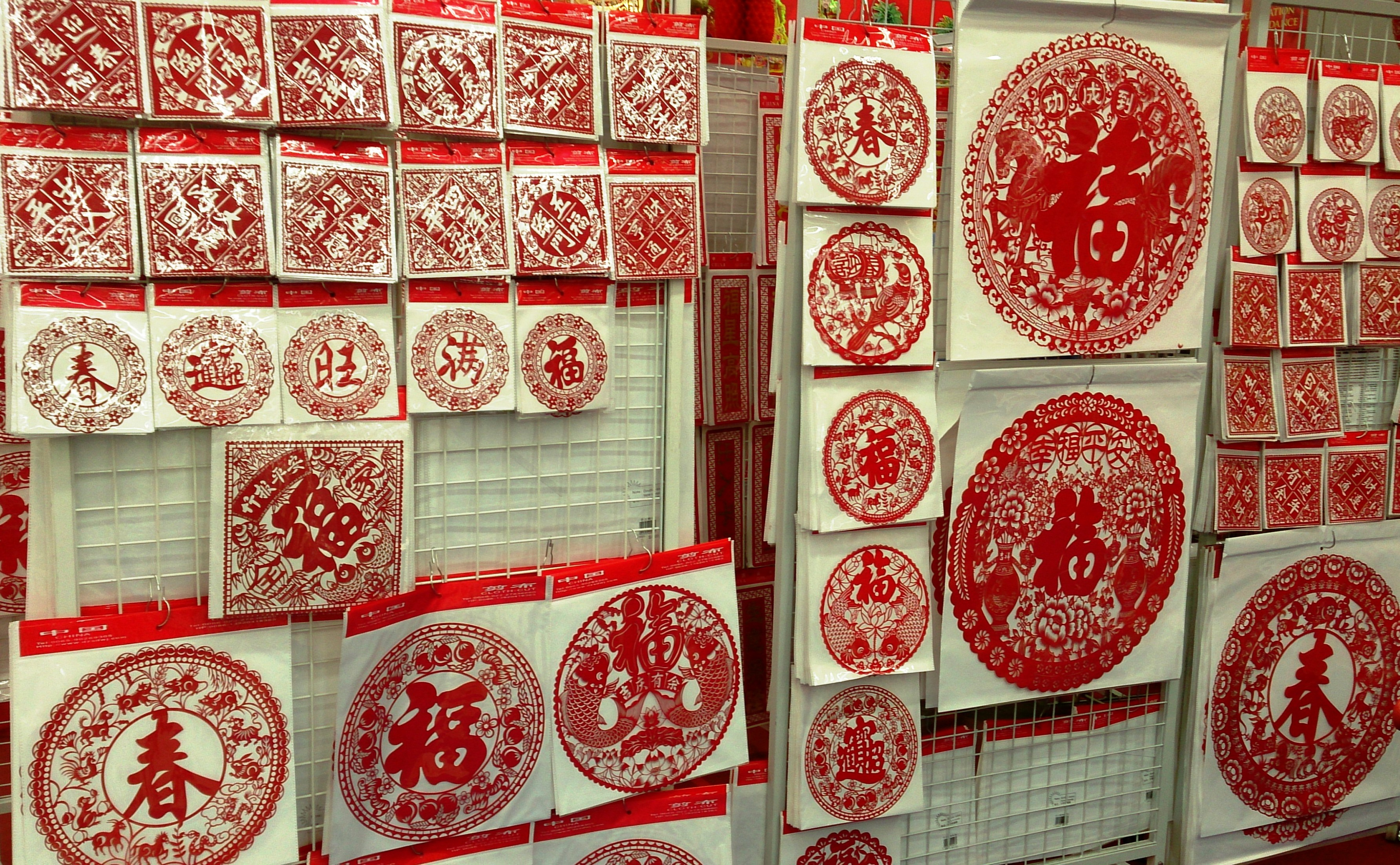
Chinese paper cuttings (2014)

Papercutting or paper cutting is the art of paper designs that has evolved all over the world to adapt to different cultural styles. One traditional distinction most styles share is that the designs are cut from a single sheet of paper as opposed to multiple adjoining sheets as in collage.

== History ==
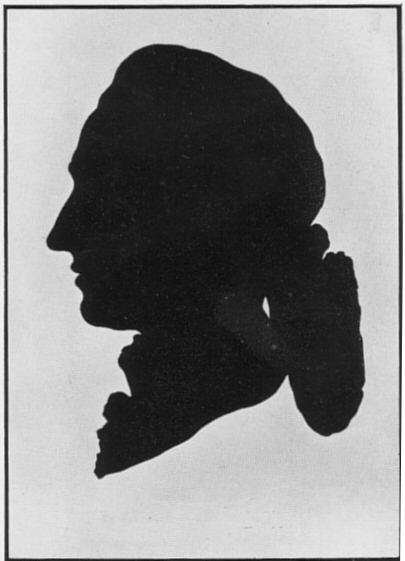
A silhouette of Goethe (1778)

Paper-cut art appeared during the Jin dynasty in 4th century AD, after the Chinese official Cai Lun invented paper in 105 AD. The oldest surviving paper cutout is a symmetrical circle from the 6th-century Six Dynasties period, found in Xinjiang, China. Papercutting continued to be practiced during the Song and Tang dynasties as a popular form of decorative art.

By the eighth or ninth century papercutting appeared in West Asia, in Europe it appeared after the 13th century – even as late as the 16th century (with Swiss and German scherenschnitte; see also Silhouette) – and it appeared in Turkey in the 16th century as well.

== Chinese ==
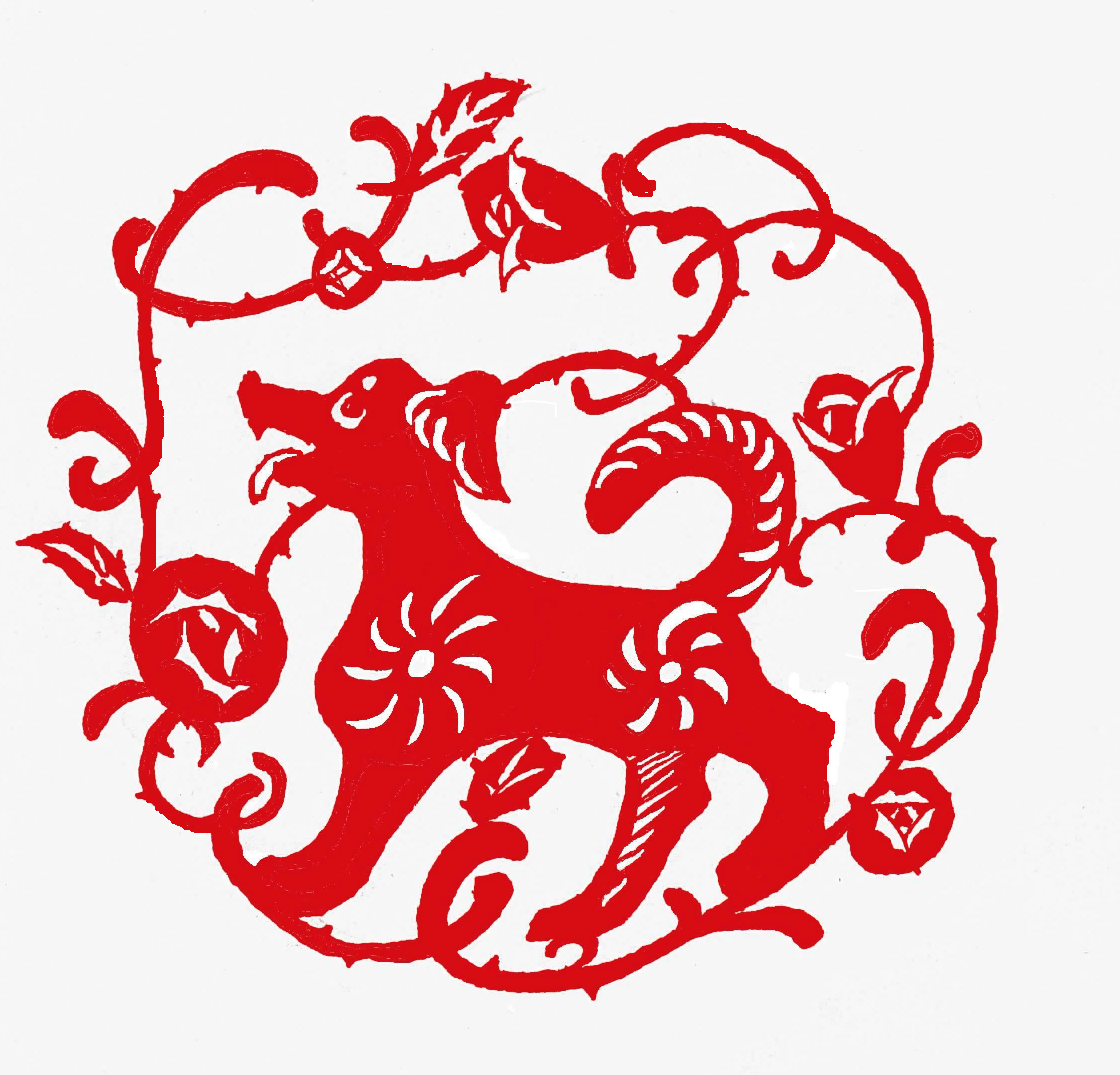
Chinese paper cutting, in a style that is practically identical to the original 6th-century form

Jianzhi (Chinese: 剪紙, pinyin: jiǎnzhǐ) is a traditional style of papercutting in China, and it originated from cutting patterns for rich Chinese embroideries and later developed into a folk art in itself. Jianzhi has been practised in China since at least the 6th century AD. Jianzhi has a number of distinct uses in Chinese culture, almost all of which are for health, prosperity or decorative purposes. Red is the most commonly used colour. Jianzhi cuttings often have a heavy emphasis on Chinese characters symbolizing the Chinese zodiac animals. It is included in the UNESCO Intangible Cultural Heritage Lists, which was created in 2009. The Chinese papercutting was recognized and listed because it has a history of more than 1500 years, and it represents cultural values of the people throughout China.

Modern paper cutting has developed into a commercial industry. Papercutting remains popular in contemporary China, especially during special events like the Chinese New Year or weddings.

== Japanese ==
Japanese paper cutting is known as kirikami (紙切り; lit. 'paper cutting'), with the resulting cut-paper image known as kirie (切り絵; lit. 'cut picture') or kirigami (切り紙; lit. 'cut paper'). It is said to have developed after 610 AD when tesuki washi paper, invented in China, was brought to Japan by Doncho, a Buddhist monk from Korea. The Japanese commercialised paper-making by hand, and by 800 AD their skills were renowned. The abundance of Japanese washi meant paper cutting and offshoots such as kirikami (performance papercutting in Edo Japan) developed at a very fast pace.

The washi paper used most predominantly across the world today for paper cutting, bookbinding, tapes and multiple other uses is not tesuki washi but actually Japanese Sekishu washi, a paper developed around 800 AD in the Sekishu region (modern-day Iwami in Japan) and designated a UNESCO Intangible Cultural asset in 2009. Paper cutting continues today in Japan in contemporary forms such as framed art, installations and paper cut sculpture.

== Filipino ==
Several Philippine crafts employ paper cutting. During Filipino Christmas, the parol (a traditional star-shaped lantern) is embellished with coloured paper cut into various forms such as floral designs on the faces, pom-pons and "tails" on the points of the star.

There is also the art of pabalát (wrapper), where coloured paper is meticulously cut with small scissors and used to sheathe pastillas de leche (carabao milk candy) and other traditional sweets. Paper cutting is also involved in the creation of banderitas (bunting) that feature prominently in fiesta décor; these may be elaborate or plain-cut paper squares and triangles strung over streets.

== Jewish ==
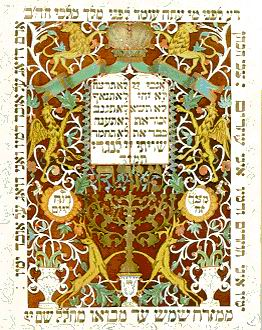
Mizrah papercut, Eastern Europe, 19th century

Papercutting has been a common Jewish art form since the Middle Ages, connected with various customs and ceremonies, and associated with holidays and family life. Paper cuts often decorated ketubot (marriage contracts), mizrahs, and for ornaments on festive occasions. A story tells of Rabbi Shem-Tov ben Yitzhak ben Ardutiel, finding that his ink had frozen, continued to write the manuscript by cutting the letters into the paper. By about the 17th century, papercutting had become a popular form for small religious artifacts such as mizrachs and Shavuot decorations. In the 20th century, the art of Jewish papercutting was revived in Israel. Today it is most commonly used for mizrachs and ketubot.

== Mexican ==
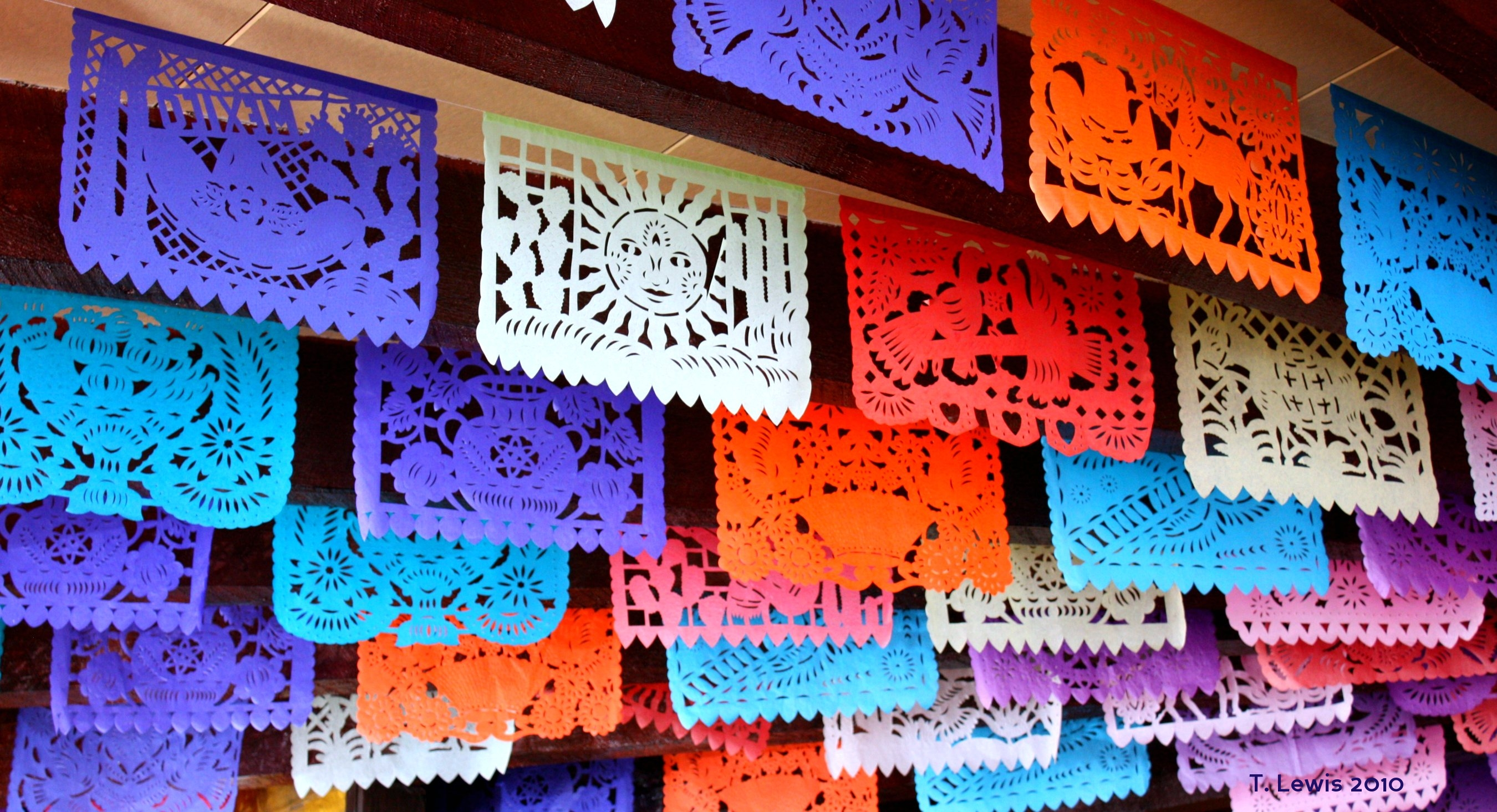
Papel picado in Mexico

Papel picado is the Mexican art of paper cutting. Tissue paper is cut into intricate designs with scissors or small, sharp chisels; this technique is frequently used to produce decorative banners.

== Slavic ==
The Slavic version of the art form of papercutting, popular in Belarus, Poland, and Ukraine, is called Wycinanki ([vɨt͡ɕiˈnaŋkʲi]) in Poland or Vytynanky (Витина́нки) in Ukraine or Vycinanki (Выцінанкі) in Belarus. Roosters, flowers, and holiday motifs are frequently the subject matter of these bright and multilayered artworks.

In 2024, an element "Vytsinanka, Traditional Art of Paper Cutting in Belarus" was inscribed on the UNESCO Representative List of the Intangible Cultural Heritage of Humanity.

== Swedish ==
During Christmas, flowers of cut and manipulated paper, fringed candy holders called crackers, and ljuskrona which are covered with cut paper are often found in Swedish and Swedish-American homes.

== Switzerland ==
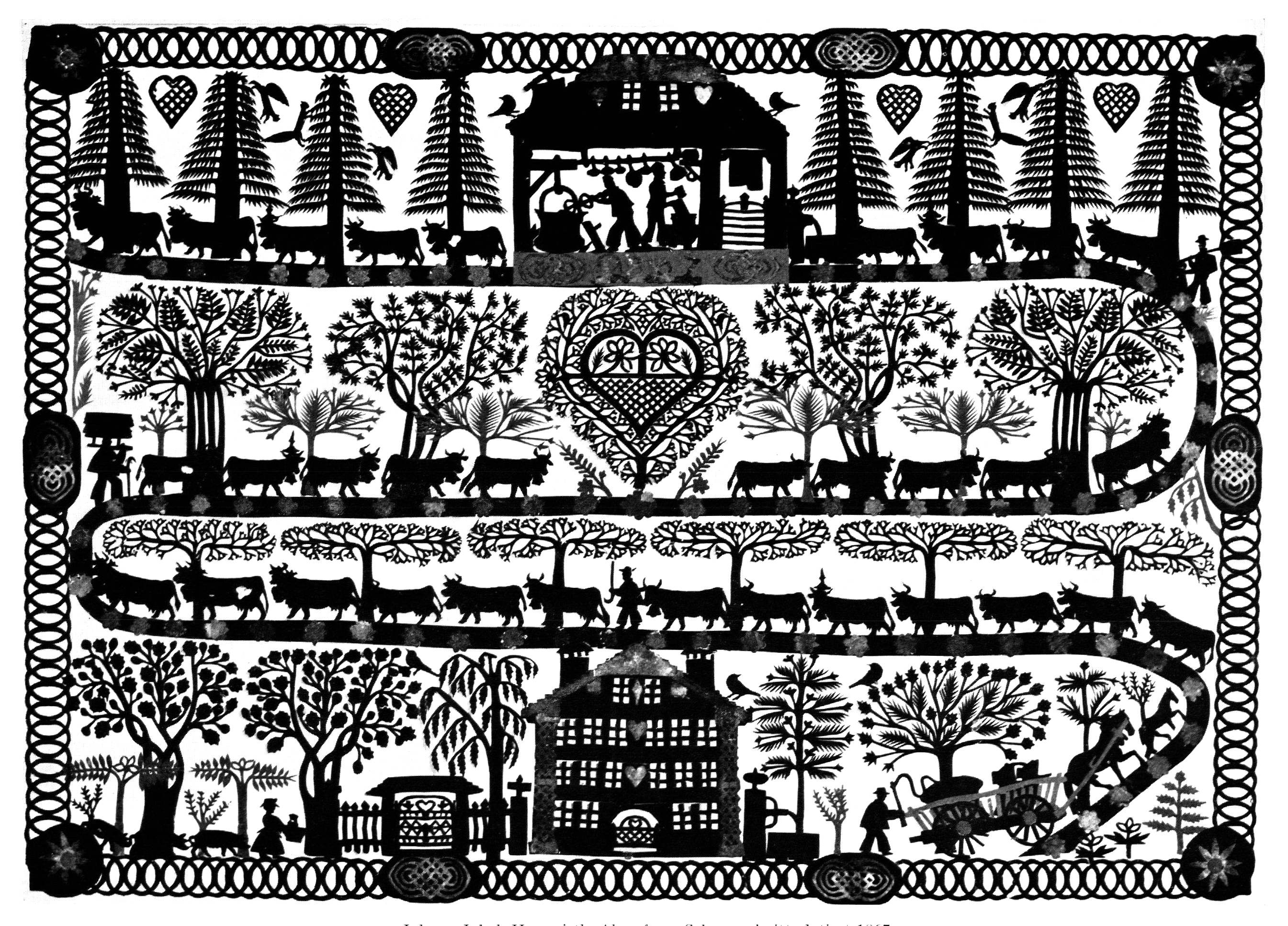
Dairy farming and cheesemaking traditions represented with paper-cutting technique (1867)

There is a Swiss tradition of papercutting, especially in the Pays-d'Enhaut.

== Other ==
Silhouette can refer to the art of cutting outlines or portraits out of black paper. Modern-day papercutters typically follow one or more of the "traditional" styles listed above, while others have begun to expand the art into new styles, motifs, and designs. Contemporary papercutting is also sometimes associated with the art of stenciling, itself being derived from the techniques used in graffiti art. The use of hand-cut stencils in graffiti art has received international attention in recent years due in part to the artist Banksy.

== Notable papercut artists ==
- Joanna Koerten (1650–1715) Dutch silhouette artist
- Adele Schopenhauer (1797–1849), German author, artist, and sister of the philosopher Arthur Schopenhauer
- Hans Christian Andersen (1805–1875), Danish story-teller, author, and papercut artist
- Henri Matisse (1869–1954), French painter, who explored paper-cut illustration and decoupage
- Jan Pieńkowski (1936–2022) Polish illustrator, writer and designer of children's books using silhouettes
- Lotte Reiniger (1899–1981), German silhouette animation filmmaker
- Barbara Earl Thomas (b. 1948), American visual artist, writer, and arts administrator based in Seattle
- Carmen Lomas Garza (born 1948), Chicana papel picado artist and illustrator
- Xiaoguan Qiao (b. 1957), Chinese papercut artist
- Karen Bit Vejle (born 1958), Danish papercut artist
- Virgilijus Trakimavičius (born 1958), Lithuanian papercut and grattage artist
- Jeanette Kuvin Oren (born 1961), American papercut artist
- Rob Ryan (born 1962), British papercut and serigraph artist
- Lane Twitchell (born 1967), contemporary American Landscape artist
- Beatriz Vasquez (born 1969), Mexican-American traditional and neo-Papel picado artist
- Kara Walker (born 1969), contemporary African American artist
- William Schaff (born 1973), American papercut artist; his work in cover of the album cover "I am Very Far" by Okkervil River.
- Nahoko Kojima (born 1981), contemporary Japanese papercut art, who creates sculptural, hanging papercuts
- Nikki McClure, American papercut artist
- Tusif Ahmad, Australian Islamic papercut artist
- Viačaslaŭ Dubinka (1941–2010), Belarusian papercut artist.

== See also ==
- Birchbark biting
- Chad (paper), leftover fragments from cutting
- Chinese paper cutting
- Chinese paper folding
- Kurpie paper cutout
- Leaf carving
- Origami
- Papel picado
- Scherenschnitte
- Silhouette
- Stencil
- Vytynanky (Wycinanki)
