= Jeanette Kuvin Oren =

Jeanette Kuvin Oren is an American contemporary artist specializing in Jewish art, fiber art, mosaics, stained glass, calligraphy, papercutting and painting.

Kuvin Oren (born in 1961) graduated from Princeton University (B.A. 1983) and Yale University (M.P.H. 1985). Kuvin Oren has been a full-time artist of Judaica since 1984. Kuvin Oren's work has been commissioned by more than 450 synagogues, community centers, day schools and camps. Kuvin Oren creates Torah covers (Torah mantles), Ark curtains, wall-hangings, Glass Ark Doors, mosaics, stained glass, huppahs (wedding canopies), marriage contracts (ketubot) and papercuttings.

Jeanette Kuvin Oren is the designer of the USPS Hanukkah Stamp 2022. Jeanette Kuvin Oren is featured in the documentary series ArtFUL 2023.

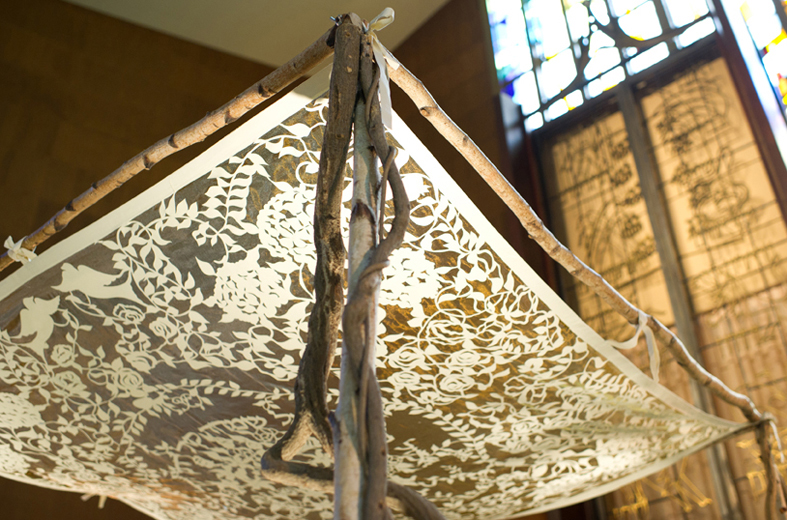
Huppah by Jeanette Kuvin Oren
