= Kamikiri (papercutting) =

Traditional Japanese performing art

Kamikiri (紙切り) is the traditional Japanese art of papercutting, performed on stage to a live audience. Kamikiri as a style of performing art dates back to Edo period-Japan (1603–1867).

In kamikiri, the performer takes suggestions from the audience, and quickly cuts a piece of paper with scissors to create the suggested figure to musical accompaniment.

== See also ==
- Kirigami – Art of folding and cutting paper
