= Nahoko Kojima =

Japanese artist

- Born: Hyogo, Japan
- Education: Kuwasawa Design Institute, Tokyo
- Known for: Contemporary Paper Cut Art
- Notable work: Kiku Flowers, Alice, Chandelier, The Cloud Leopard, Byaku, Washi, BVLGARI Bridal Art, Honey.
- Movement: Paper Cut Sculpture
- Awards: BVLGARI Bridal Art 2015, US ArtPrize 2014 Top 5, Jerwood Makers Open 2013, Collect 2012

Nahoko Kojima (小島 奈保子, Kojima Nahoko) (born 2 October 1981) is a contemporary Japanese paper cut artist. She started Kirie (Japanese Papercutting) under private tutelage at the age of five and continued throughout her formative years. In 1999 she moved to Tokyo and in 2004 she graduated from a degree in design at Kuwasawa Institute. An avid follower of fashion and trends, she found much of her inspiration in the city. She briefly pursued a career in graphic design in Tokyo before moving to London in 2005 to learn more of the Western culture of the arts. Her first solo Paper Cut show in London exhibited the five senses collection at the Epicurean Lounge in 2007.

By 2009 she was cutting professionally, filling the Exposure Gallery in Central London with over 100 paper cuts some from her time in Tokyo with the majority cut in London. In 2010, Kojima opened her studio in Central London and started working on multiple works including the Majestic Birds, Kiku Flowers Collection, the full colour Alice Collection, based on the book by Lewis Carroll and numerous commissions, selling works mostly to private collectors and members of the public attending her Open Studio events. In 2011 she co-founded Solo & Kojima in Clerkenwell, a company specialising in Paper Cut Art and Design consultation.

In 2012, Kojima was successful in being selected by the Craft Council for Collect, at the Saatchi Gallery in London. The piece unveiled at the show was a new experiment which saw Paper Cuts being treated as sculpture, challenging established views. Kojima is known to create one-off designs that are never duplicated and often based on the forces of nature. For Collect she showed just one piece, the life-sized Cloud Leopard, one hand-cut sheet of black paper, suspended from the ceiling in a manner that created a sculptural representation of the animal intertwined with narrative and hidden characters. It took five months to complete and the piece was very successful because of Kojima's pioneering technique, turning traditionally flat wall hung pieces into sculptures floating in exhibition halls. The Cloud Leopard toured in Europe in partnership with the Italian cultural organisation Arte&Arte, showing at Villa Olmo in Como Italy, Le Beffroi in Paris and was part of 2013 Clerkenwell Design Week in London. Regarding her process Kojima is quoted as having said:

"When I was a child I would lie down on my back on the grass and draw the underside of flowers. I think when we discover a hidden beauty, we leave our bodies and look on ourselves, the object and environment, all as one lovely epiphany".

In 2013, Kojima was awarded the Jerwood Makers Open commission for which she proposed her next major paper cut sculpture. This piece was unveiled in the same year, taking seven months to make and was called Byaku (meaning 'white' in Japanese), a handmade life-sized Polar Bear cut using only one 3m x 3m sheet of white Japanese washi paper. In 2014, Kojima unveiled Washi, a life-sized Bald Eagle made from a single sheet of paper in her debut American show at the Gerald Ford Presidential Library in Grand Rapids MI, USA. The artist was nominated among the top five in her category for ArtPrize2014 by a public vote.

Immediately after her US debut Nahoko Kojima was invited to pitch to redesign bridal displays in hundreds of shop windows in over 90 stores across the Asia region for the luxury brand BVLGARI. She won the contract and cut a 16 metre long piece by hand for the flagship Bulgari store in Ginza, Tokyo. The work featuring doves holding Bulgari's interlocking heart motif was inspired by her time in Rome when she saw thousands of birds flying across the sky, as explained in the short film about her work for the brand, commissioned by BVLGARI. The paper cut Doves and Hearts campaign was rolled out in Bulgari stores across Asia during 2015 by Solo Kojima, with key venues installed personally by the artist in Tokyo, Osaka, London, Taipei, Shanghai, Beijing, Seoul and Singapore.

In Fall 2015 Nahoko Kojima did a solo show in the Wirth Gallery in The Holburne Museum, Bath UK, which coincided with an exhibition on Gold from the Queen's Royal Collection. She revealed her latest sculpture, Honey (2015), a single sheet of Gold Japanese Washi paper cut suspended in a spiral shape creating a beehive with honeycomb patterns and detail of the flight of bees. Workshops and talks by the artist were sold out and Kojima received praise from critics and the media.

In June 2016, Nahoko Kojima won the coveted Kuwasawa Award which she accepted at a ceremony in Tokyo. The Award is given for those Japanese artists and designers who have made a considerable contribution in their chosen disciplines. The trophy was designed by the master Japanese Sculptor, Churyo Sato (佐藤忠良).

In 2017 the artist released the Human Collection a series of wearable paper cut pieces inspired by her background in fashion design. Shiro (2018) is Kojima's largest piece to date, over 23 metres in length, a life sized Blue Whale cut by hand from two sheets of custom made Japanese Washi paper. The piece was unveiled at the BACC, for her debut show in Bangkok and saw over 10,000 visitors a week. Local build vendors, employed staff and also volunteers contributed to the success of the show and the piece took over 120 hours just to install.

In 2019 Lexus approached the artist to take part in the feature-length movie, TAKUMI, "A 60,000 hour story on the survival of human craft", directed by the acclaimed American Director, Clay Jeter, also known for directing Chef's Table on Netflix. The collaboration saw multiple shoots in Japan and exhibitions of the artist's papercut sculptures and art in Dubai, Tokyo and Fukuoka Japan. The Takumi film premiered at the DOC NYC film festival, then on Amazon Prime and is now available to watch freely online

At the end of 2019, Nahoko Kojima unveiled her latest sculpture, Sumi (2019) at the Dulwich Picture Gallery, a respected museum in London UK, which coincided with learning events curated around the artist's Papercut Art.
