= Scherenschnitte =

Artwork produced by paper cutting

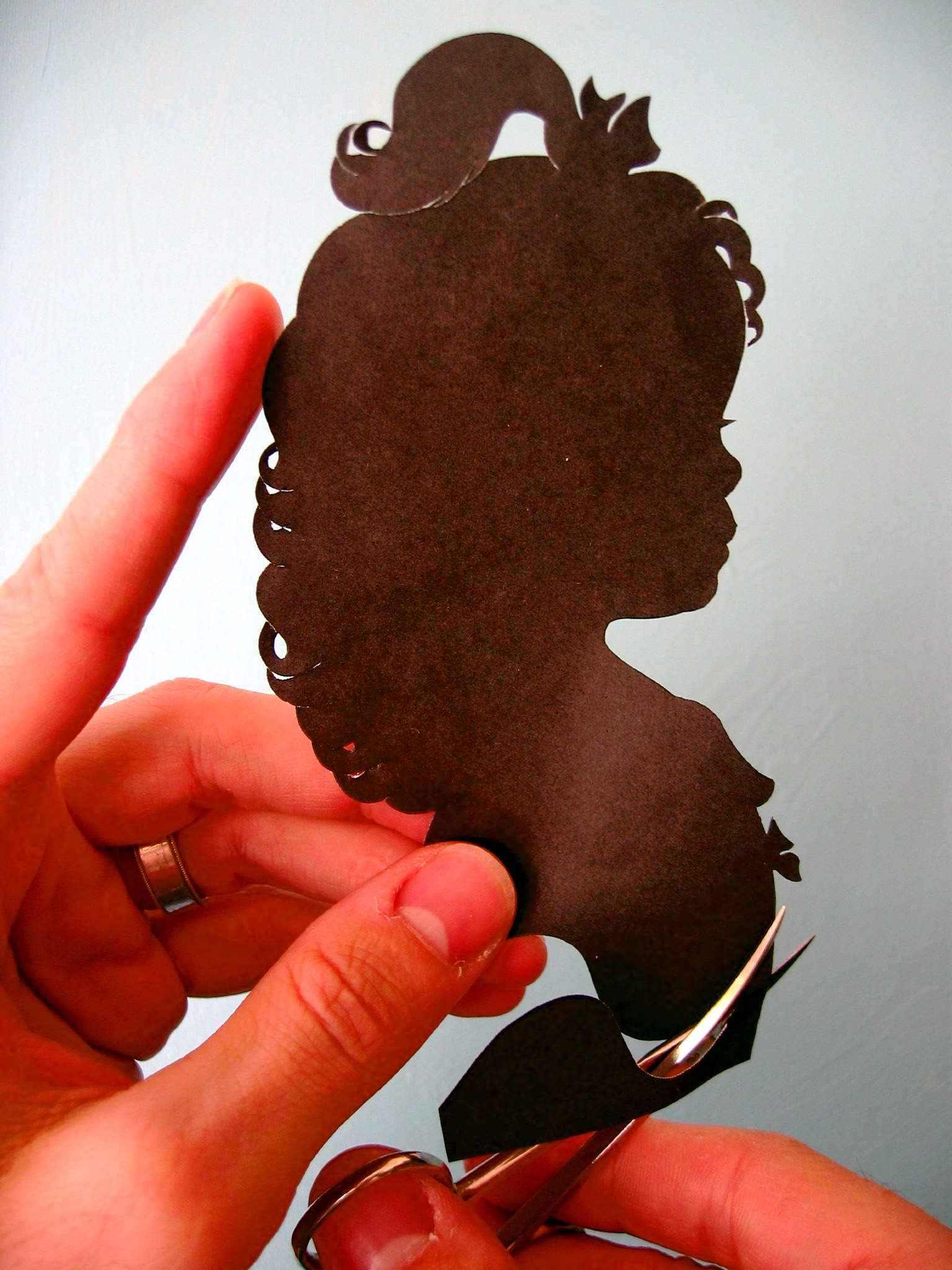

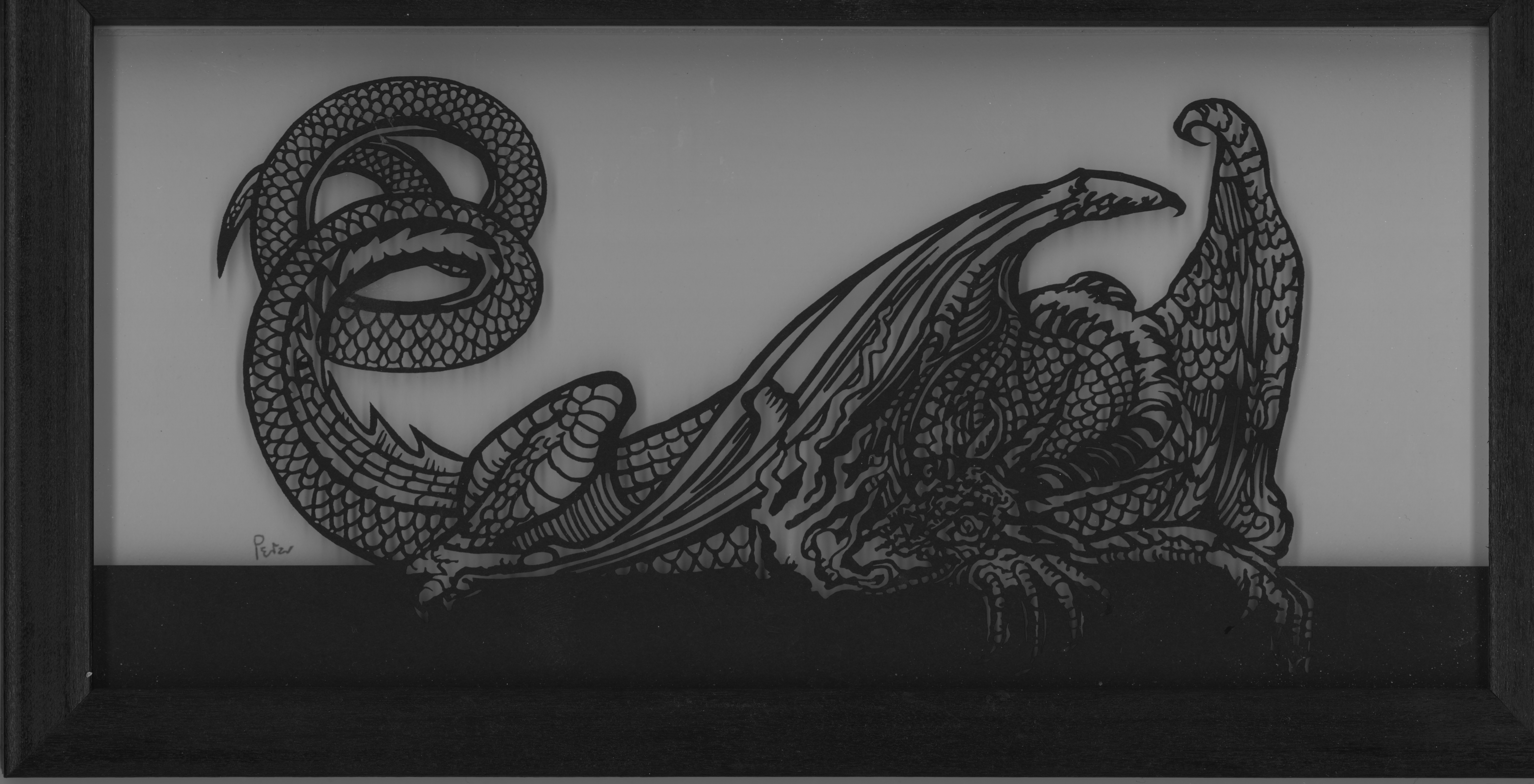

Scherenschnitte (German pronunciation: [ˈʃeːʁənˌʃnɪtə]), which means "scissor cuts" in German, is the art of paper cutting design. The artwork often has rotational symmetry within the design, and common forms include silhouettes, valentines, and love letters. The art tradition was founded in Switzerland and Germany in the 16th century and was brought to Colonial America in the 18th century by Swiss and German immigrants who settled primarily in Pennsylvania.

== See also ==
- Jewish paper cutting
- Chinese paper cutting
- Kurpie paper cutout
- Papel picado
