= Leaf carving =

Art of trimming plant leaves to form silhouettes

Leaf carving is an artwork involving the delicate trimming of leaves to develop a picture or landscape. The process of carving is performed by artists using tools to carefully cut the surface without cutting or removing the veins. The veins add detail into the subject matter of the carving. Leaf carving originated out of China and gained popularity in 1994 by artist Huag Tai Sheng after he got the Guinness Book of World Records to recognize his work. The art may be related to Chinese paper cutting. The material or most common leaf used in leaf carving is that of the Chinar tree. The Chinar tree is native to India, Pakistan and China. Chinar leaves have a close resemblance to maple leaves.
