= Stach Konwa =

Polish folk hero

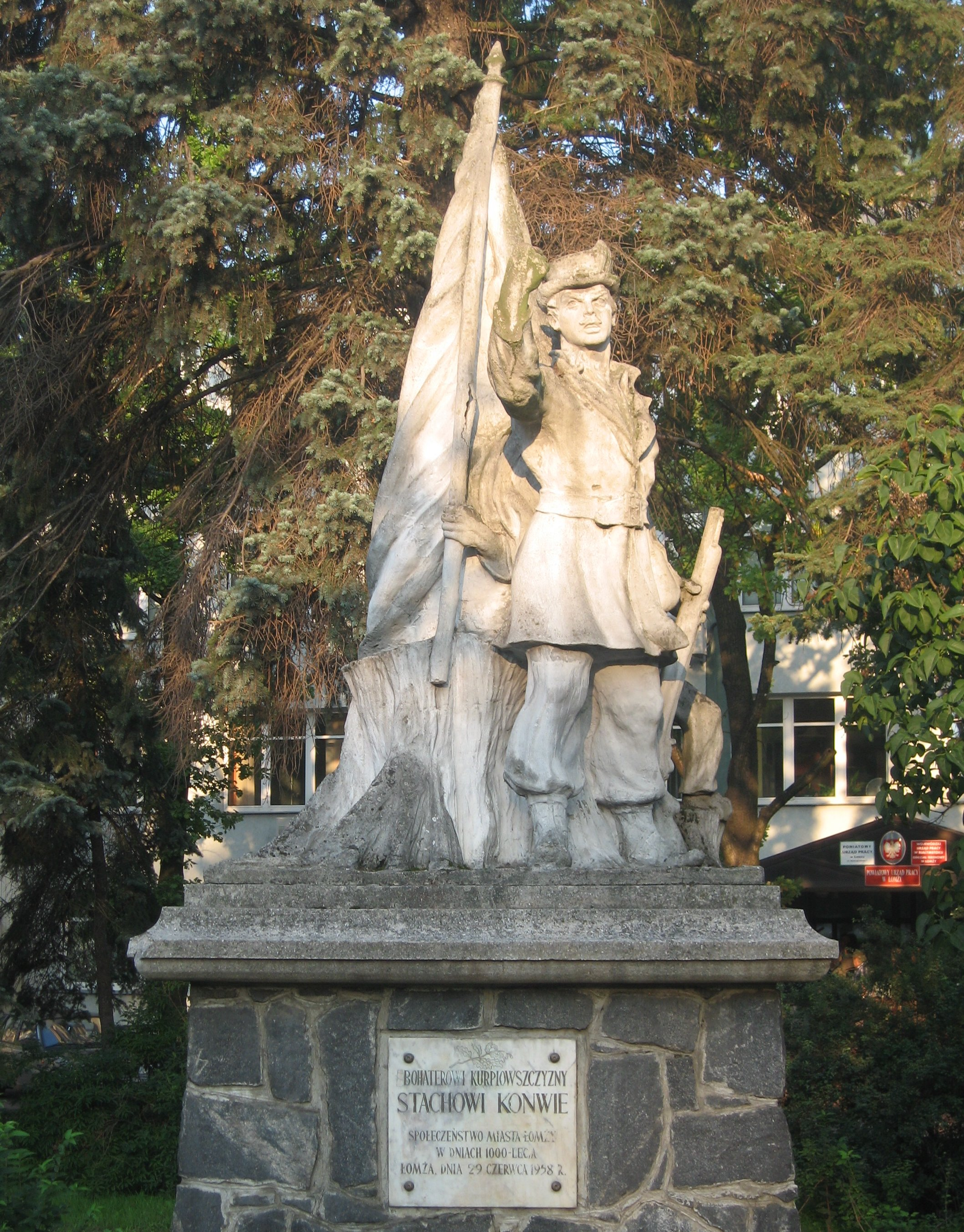
Stach Konwa

Stach Konwa is a legendary Polish hero, especially important to the inhabitants of the Polish Kurpie region. According to legend, he was born in Nowogród and died about 1734–1735.

Stach Konwa probably existed, but there are no historical sources to back this up. The name “Konwa” is not a name usually found in the Kurpie region, and it may be that it could be a pseudonym used to protect his family and friends from reprisal. On the other hand, researchers, such as Wiesław Majewski, suggest that he was created by writers attempting to stimulate public consciousness. Stach Konwa was the epitome of the myth of free and courageous Kurpie leaders, derived from the people, who fought against invaders and serfdom.

== Legend ==
According to legend, Konwa demonstrated great courage during the Great Northern War in the battle of Kopański bridge with the Swedes on the 22nd and 23 January 1708 near Myszyniec. During the War of Polish Succession he is reported to have fought on the side of Stanisław Leszczyński. And, during the time of the Konfederacja Dzikowska he commanded a division of Kurpie volunteers, which fought against Russian and Saxon troops at the battle of Jednaczewo. He lost the battle and was captured by the Saxons, who hanged him.

== Commemoration ==
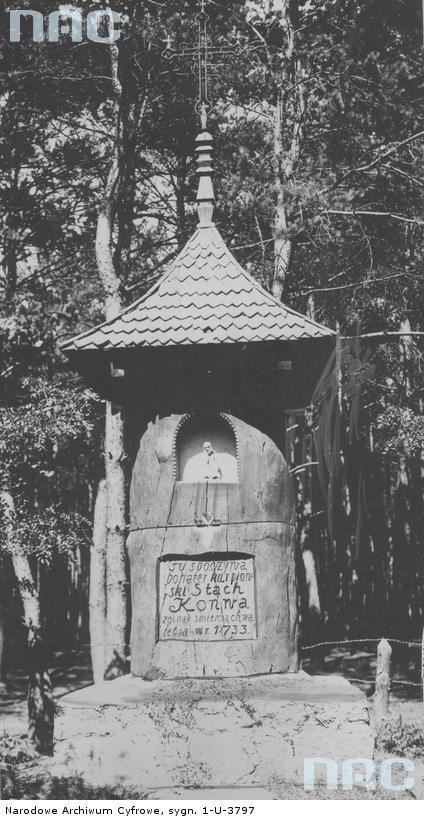
Monument in Jednaczewo. Photo from about 1922-1934

Stach Konwa remains in the memory of the people of Kurpie as a symbol of their fierce independence and resistance to Russification. The first monument was erected through the efforts of Adam Chętnik on Konwa’s grave in the Kurpie forest near Jednaczewo (unveiled June 25, 1922). The monument was destroyed during World War II.

A replica made in 1965 can be viewed in the Kurpie museum in Nowogród. The Stach Konwa monument, by Gerwazy Lörinczy, was erected in 1958 in Łomża on the occasion of the city’s 1000th anniversary. On the monument, the statue of Konwa faces east with his fist raised in that direction, perceived as an expression of opposition to Soviet domination.

== See also ==
- Kurpie
