= Piątkowizna =

- Village
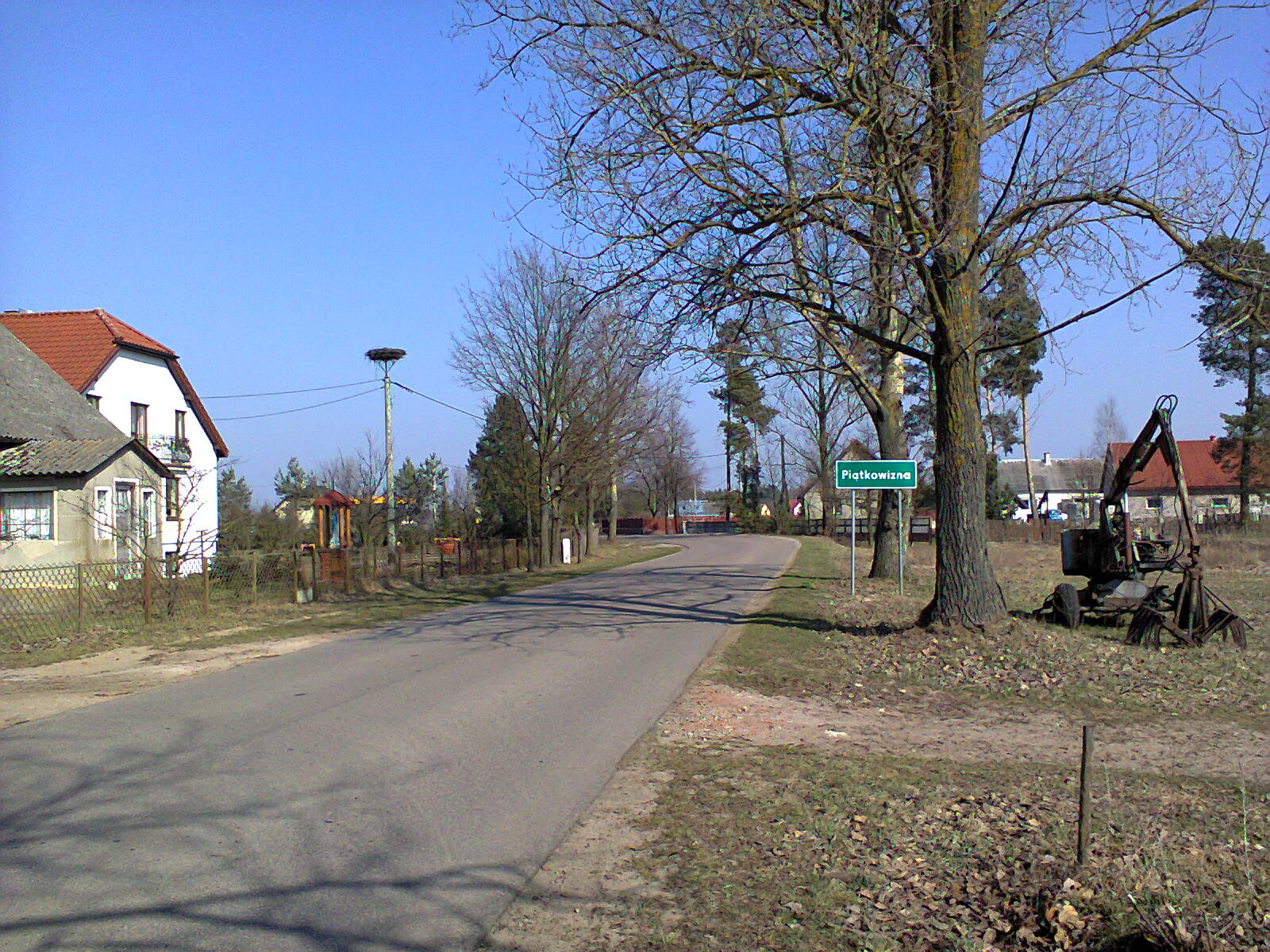

- Location within Poland
- Coordinates: 53°27′N 21°35′E
- Country: Poland
- Voivodeship: Masovian
- County: Ostrołęka
- Gmina: Łyse
- Time zone: UTC+1 (CET)
  - Summer (DST): UTC+2 (CEST)
- Postal code: 07-438
- Vehicle registration: WOS

Piątkowizna [pjɔntkɔˈvizna] is a village in the administrative district of Gmina Łyse, within Ostrołęka County, Masovian Voivodeship, in north-eastern Poland.

== History ==
The village was founded in the 18th century. As of 1827 it had a population of 208, solely Kurpie, a local subgroup of the Polish people.
