= Kurpie =

Ethnocultural region and ethnic group in Poland

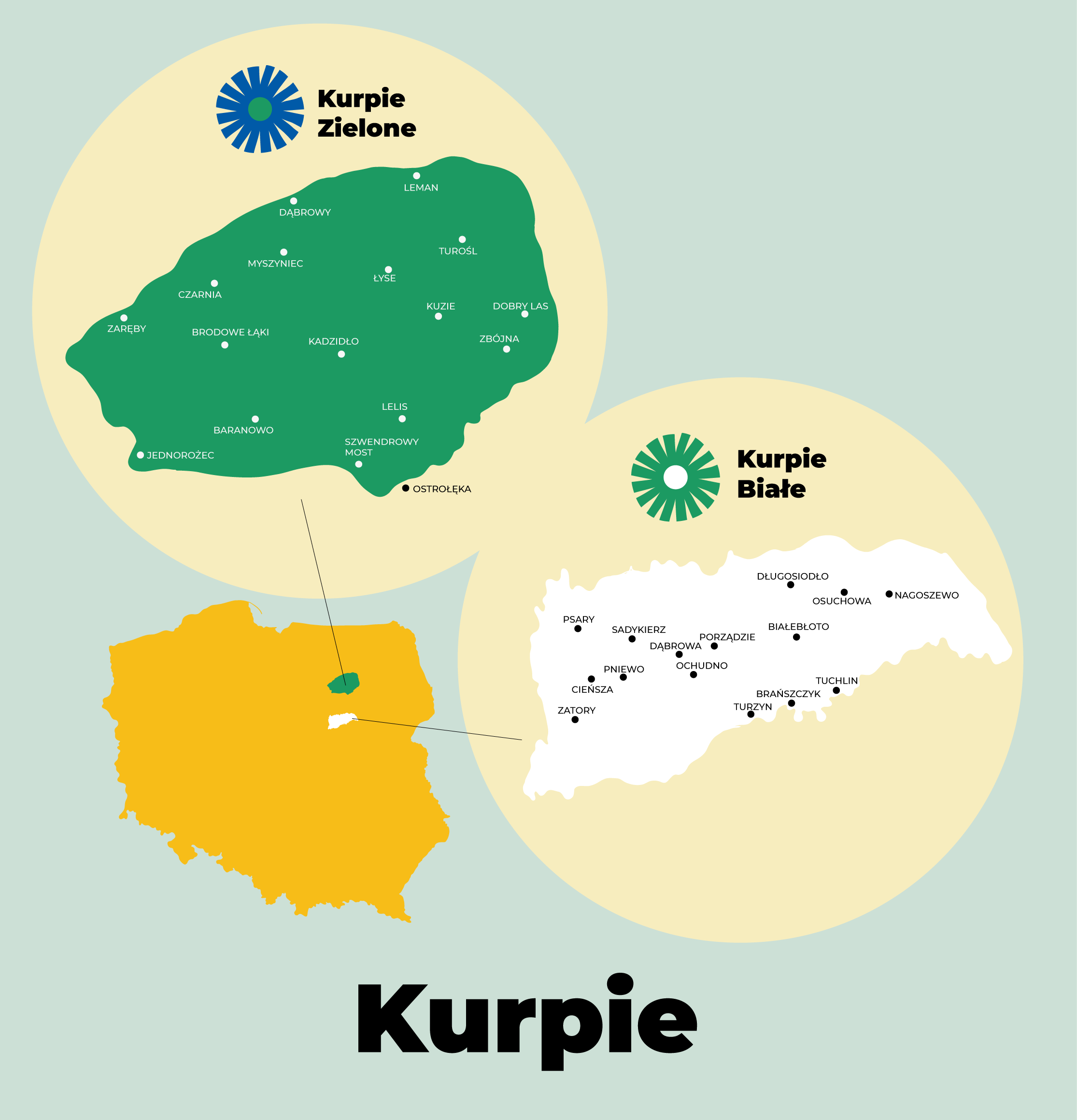
- Kurpie on the map of Poland

Regions with significant populations

Languages
- Polish (Kurpie)

Religion
- Catholicism

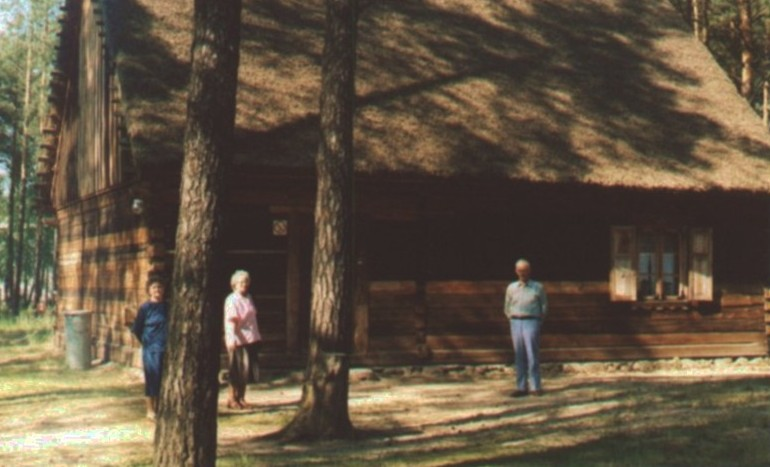
A Kurpie house. Note the thatched roof.

Kurpie (Polish pronunciation: [ˈkurpʲɛ]) is one of a number of ethnic regions in Poland, noted for its unique traditional customs, such as its own types of traditional costume, traditional dance and distinctive type of architecture and livelihoods. Kurpie is also the name of the people of this culture.

The Kurpie region is located in Poland on a lowland plain called the Mazovian Region (Mazowsze), which was once covered over by two forests known as the Puszcza Zielona (the Green Wilderness) and the Puszcza Biała (the White Wilderness).

The Green Wilderness (Puszcza Zielona) is usually associated with the White Wilderness (Puszcza Biała), and together the two forests are often referred to as the Kurpie Forest (Puszcza Kurpiowska) because the two forests were populated by inhabitants who, over the centuries of isolation, developed a unique culture of their own, called Kurpie.

On today’s map, the Kurpie region is comprised in Masovian, Podlaskie and, to a small extent, the Warmian-Masurian regions. Populated areas in Kurpie today are generally in the towns of Myszyniec and Ostrołęka and the villages of Czarnia, Dylewo, Jednorożec, Kadzidło, Lipniki, Łyse and Zbójna.

== The name Kurpie ==
The people from this region were originally called people of the wilderness (puszczaki). However, these puszczaki made their shoes from fiber from the linden tree, and these bast shoes, called kurpś, became of a name the outsiders used to describe the inhabitants of this region.

== The forests ==
The first people who settled there found the heavily forested area to be sandy and muddy. Beekeeping, producing pitch, and iron smelting were the principal commercial occupations with beekeeping highly regulated; however, families also hunted and fished, gathered mushrooms, collected fruits and nuts, and generally used the forests to provide them with their daily needs.

At home, amber was polished, and men used forest material to create wood products. The women became very accomplished in weaving linens and cloths.

Until the middle of the 19th century the Kurpie forests remained generally pristine. Soon afterwards, however, forested areas were cleared to allow farming, which, because of the poor soil, was found to be marginal. Cattle breeding was also introduced at this time.

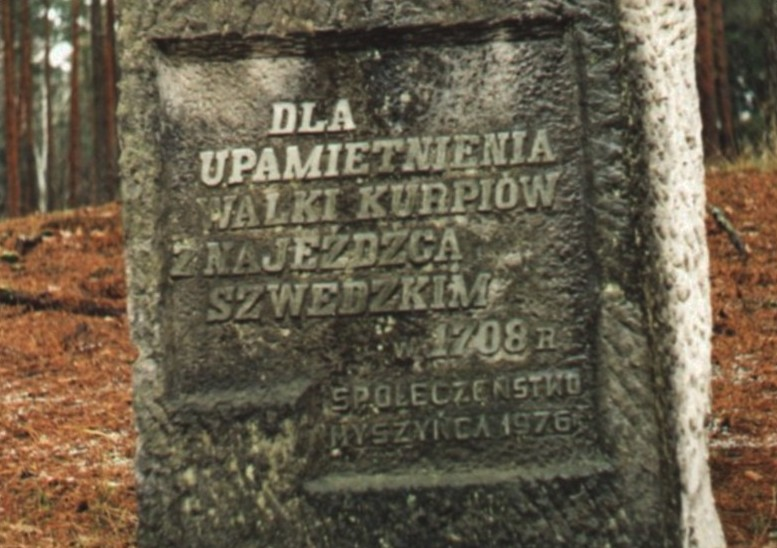
Memorial to Kurpie resistance to the Swedish invasion

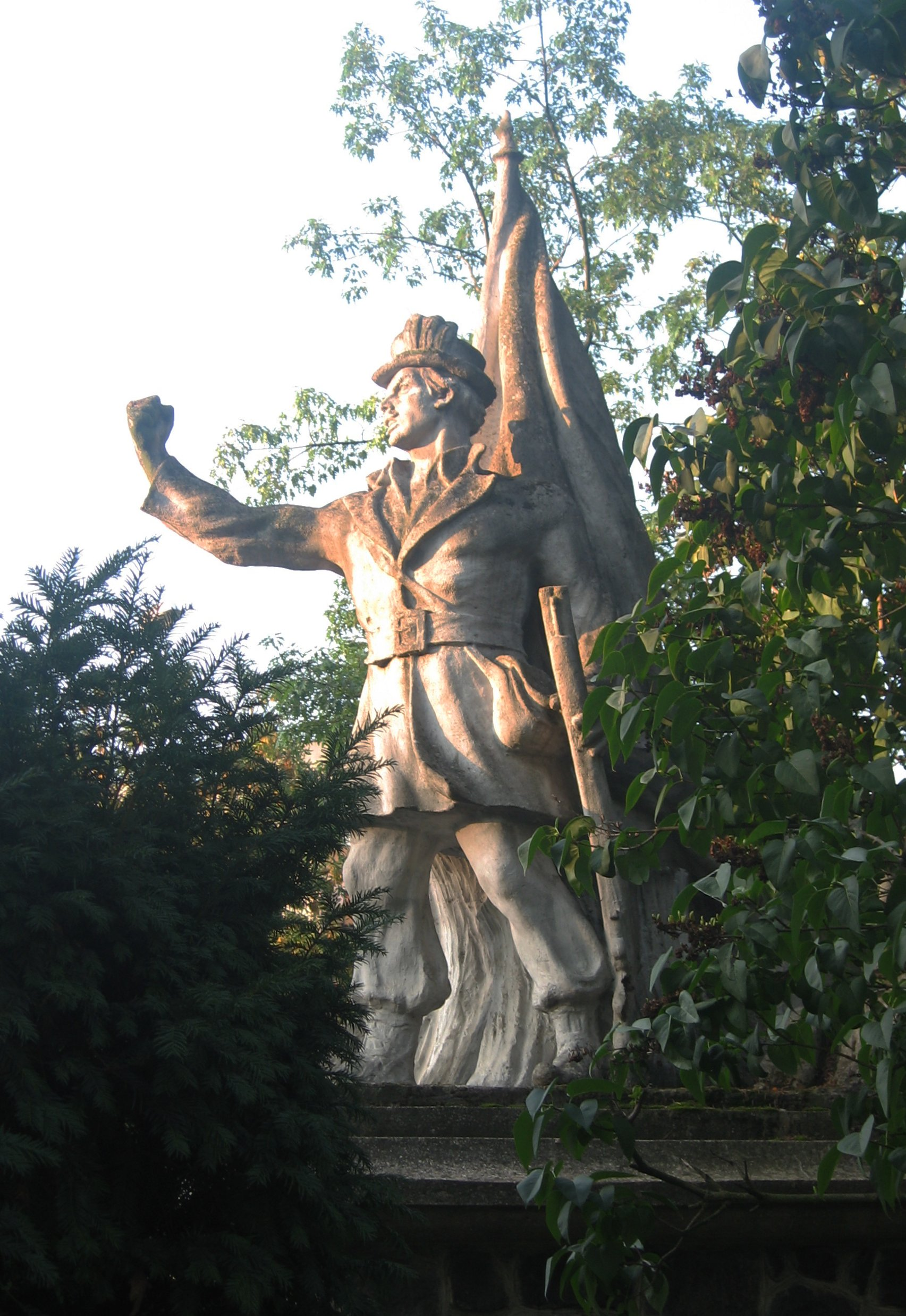
Stach Konwa - monument in Łomża

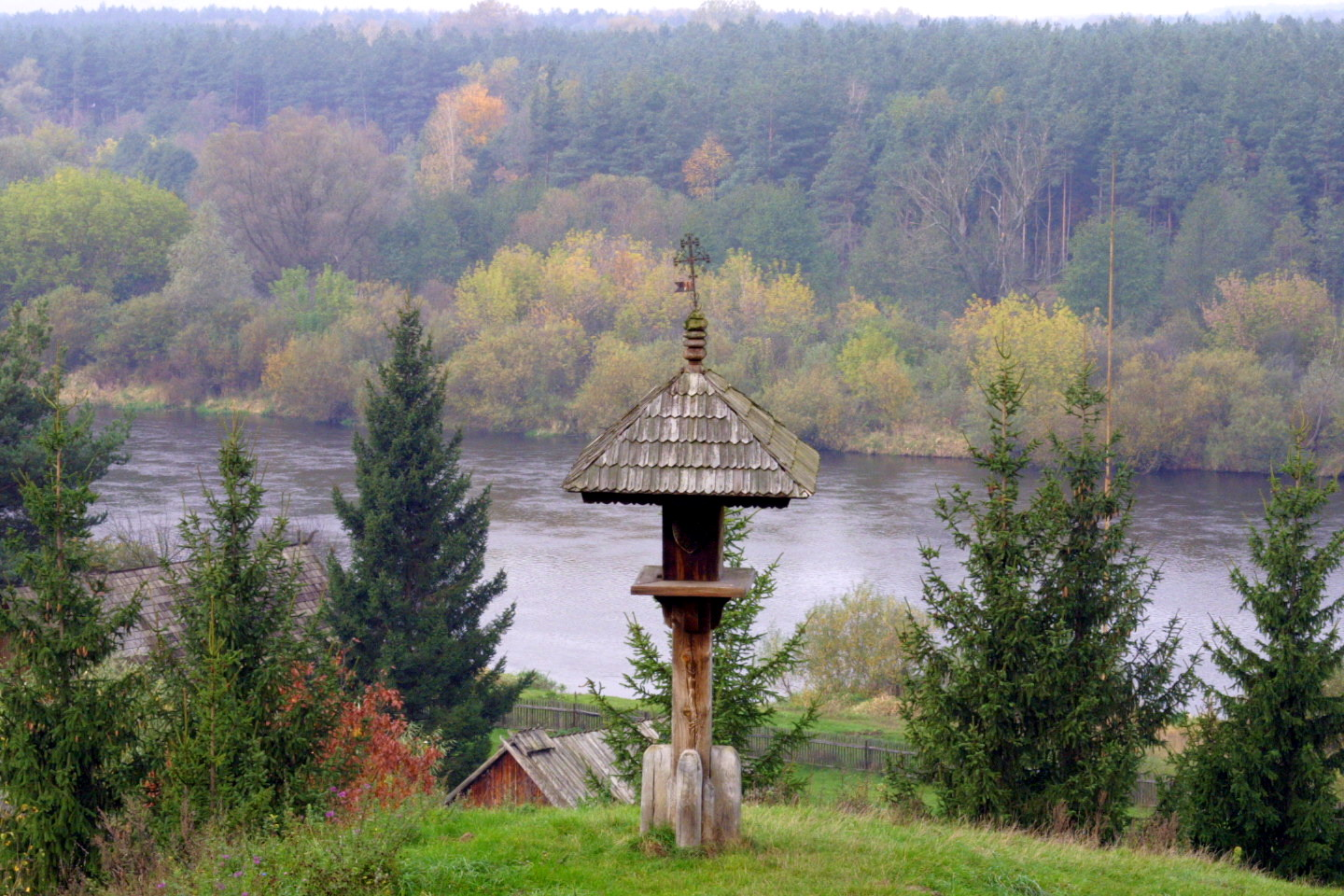
View of Narew from Kurpie Museum

== Selective chronology ==
The Kurpie region was part of Poland from the beginning of Polish history in the 10th century.

- 14th Century - Ordered colonized by Masovian Prince Janusz I
- 1563 – the great plague and fire.
- 1656 – Kurpies unsuccessfully fought the invasion of the Swedish Army.
- 1673 – the village of Lipniki was founded. Kurpie population reaches 1,000.
- 1683 – Villages of Kadzidło, Wach, Zawady and Obierwia now in existence.
- 1700s – Swedish, Russian, Saxon and Polish troops march through Kurpie during the Great Northern War.
- 1708 - a battle between the Kurpie people and the Swedish was fought near Kopański Most. King Charles XII of Sweden was placed in a position of danger after Kurpies’ attack.
- 1735 – Kurpie supported king Stanisław Leszczyński and fought Russian and Saxon troops during time of the Konfederacja Dzikowska. Stach Konwa, a Kurpie hero, was killed during the battle of Jednaczewo.
- 1794 - During the Kosciuszkowskie uprising General Antoni Madaliński, organized Kurpie infantry troops.
- 1795 – the area was placed under East Prussian governance and now had a population of 51.432.
- 1806 – Kurpies fought in the 6th Infantry Regiment of Warsaw Duchy against Austria.
- 1807 - a battle between the French and the Russian armies was fought near Ostrołęka.
- 1815 – the Kurpie region reverted to the Kingdom of Poland.
- 1831 – Kurpies participated in the November uprising in Poland forming partisans troops under Józef Zaliwski.
- 1863 – Kurpies participated in the January uprising in Poland supporting Zygmunt Padlewski troops.
- 1880-1910 – numerous Kurpie residents emigrated to America because of the inability of the land to support the growing number of people.
- World War II – Kurpies formed resistance movements against the Nazis.
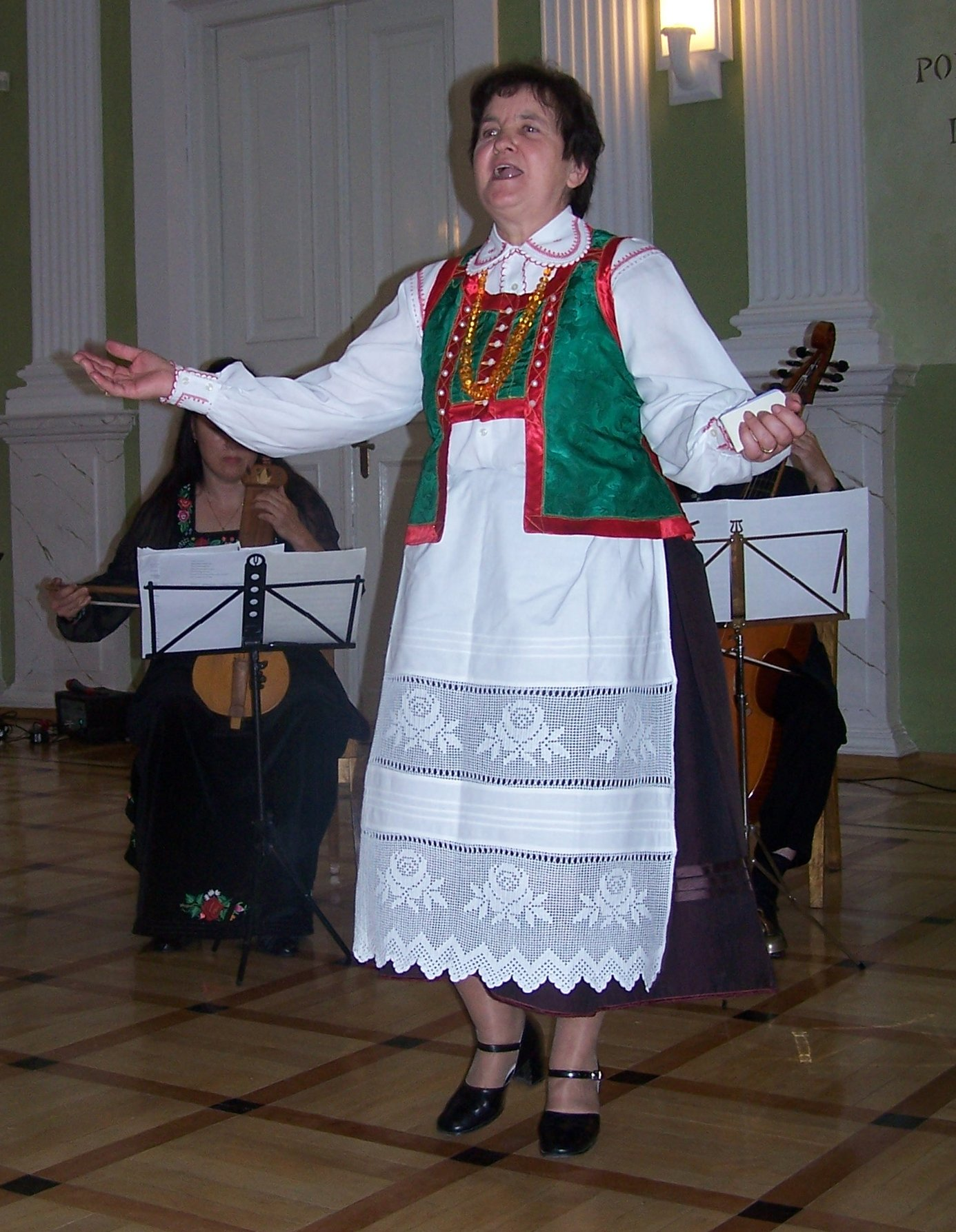
Apolonia Nowak, folk artist

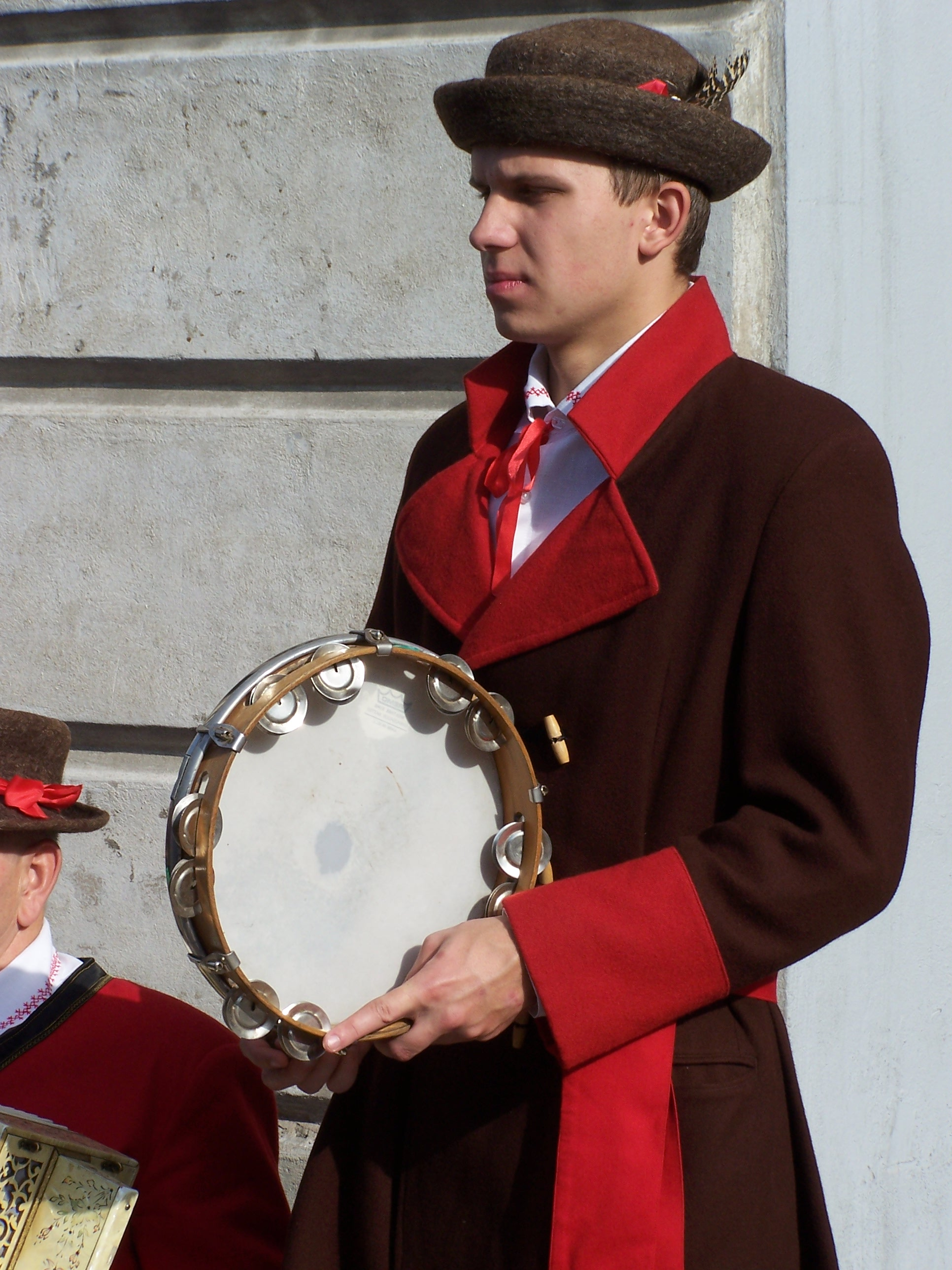
Kurp from Kadzidło, Poland

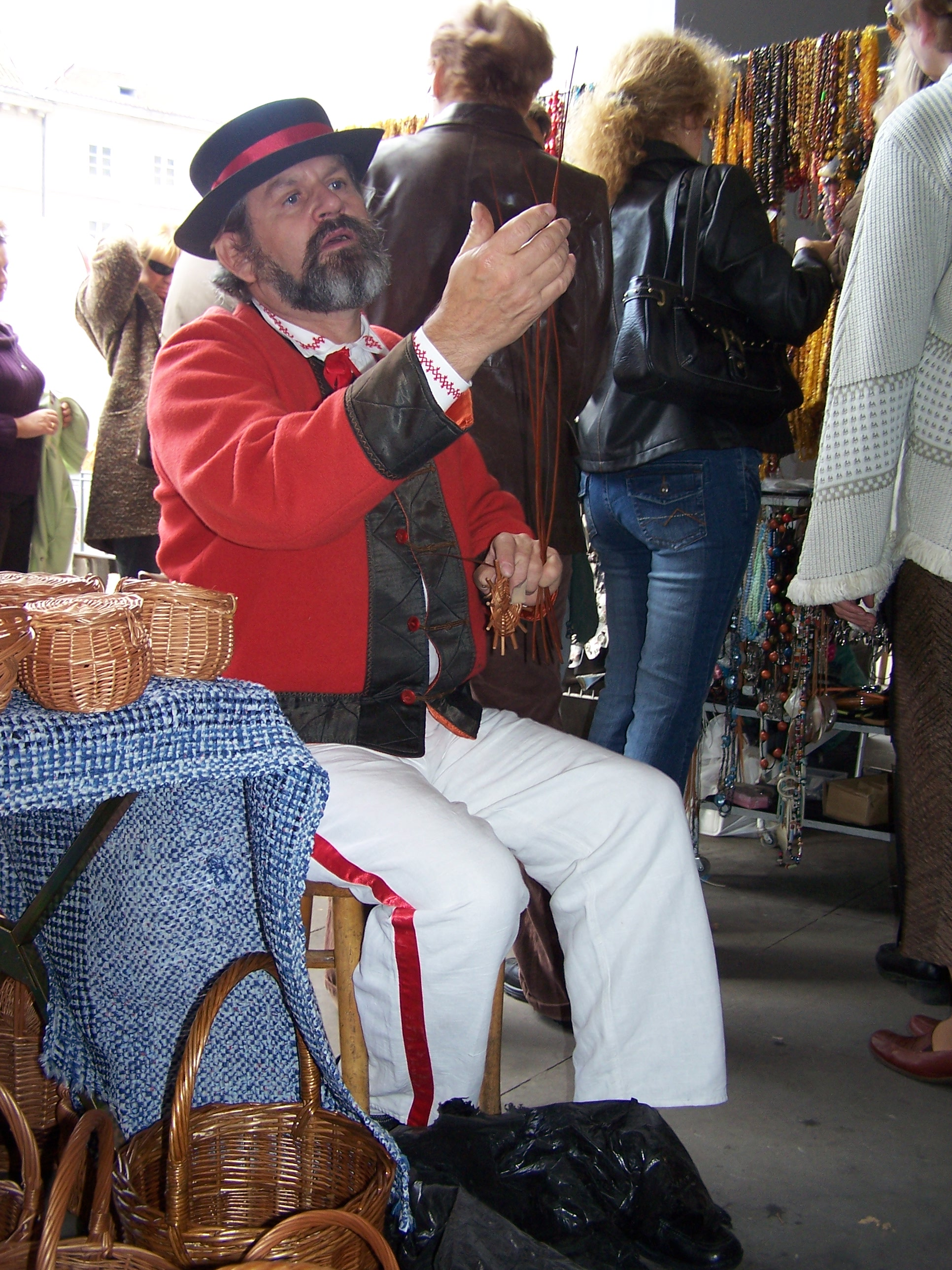
Wiesław Kuskowski from Ostrołęka, Poland

== Kurpie traditions ==
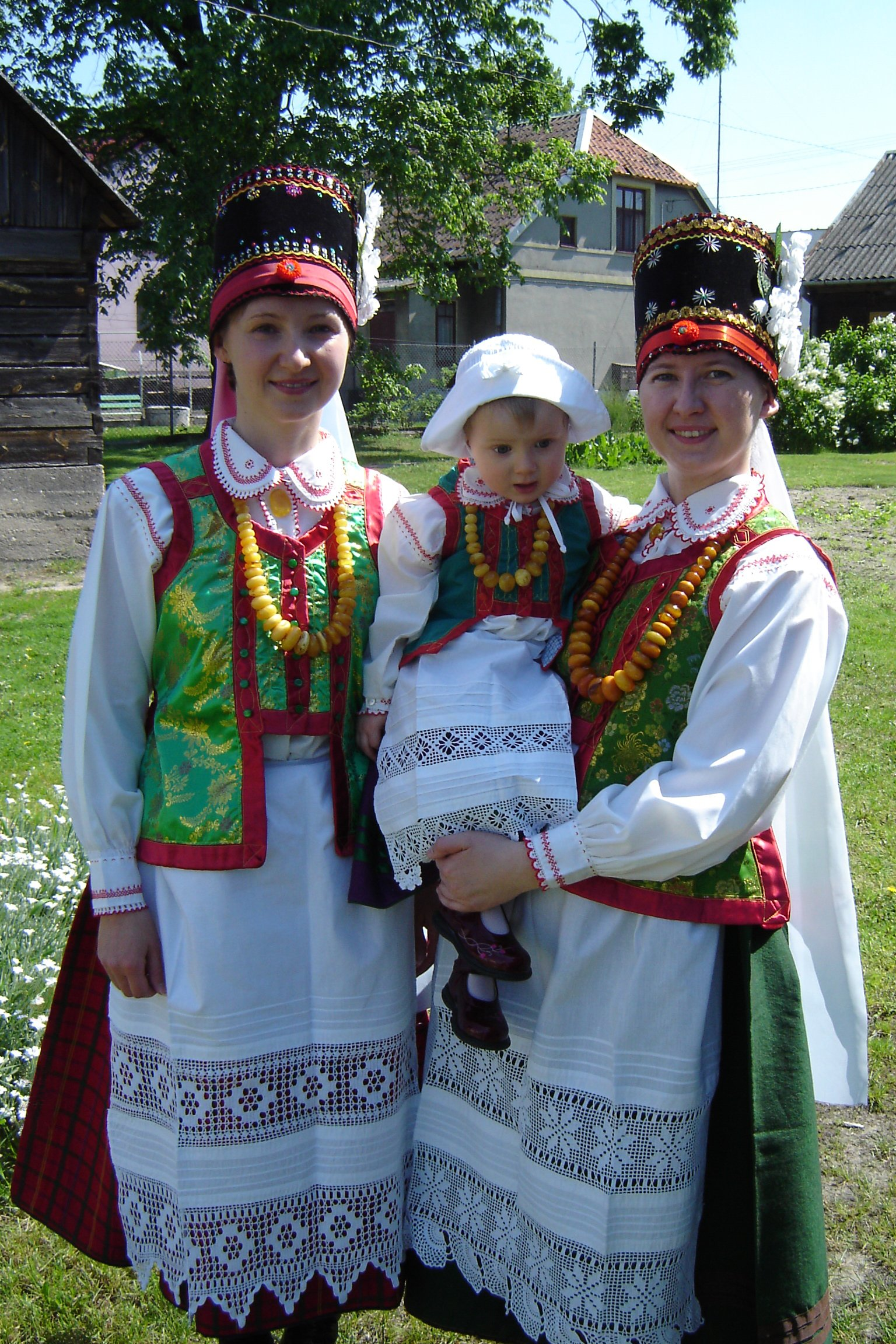
Kurpie costume

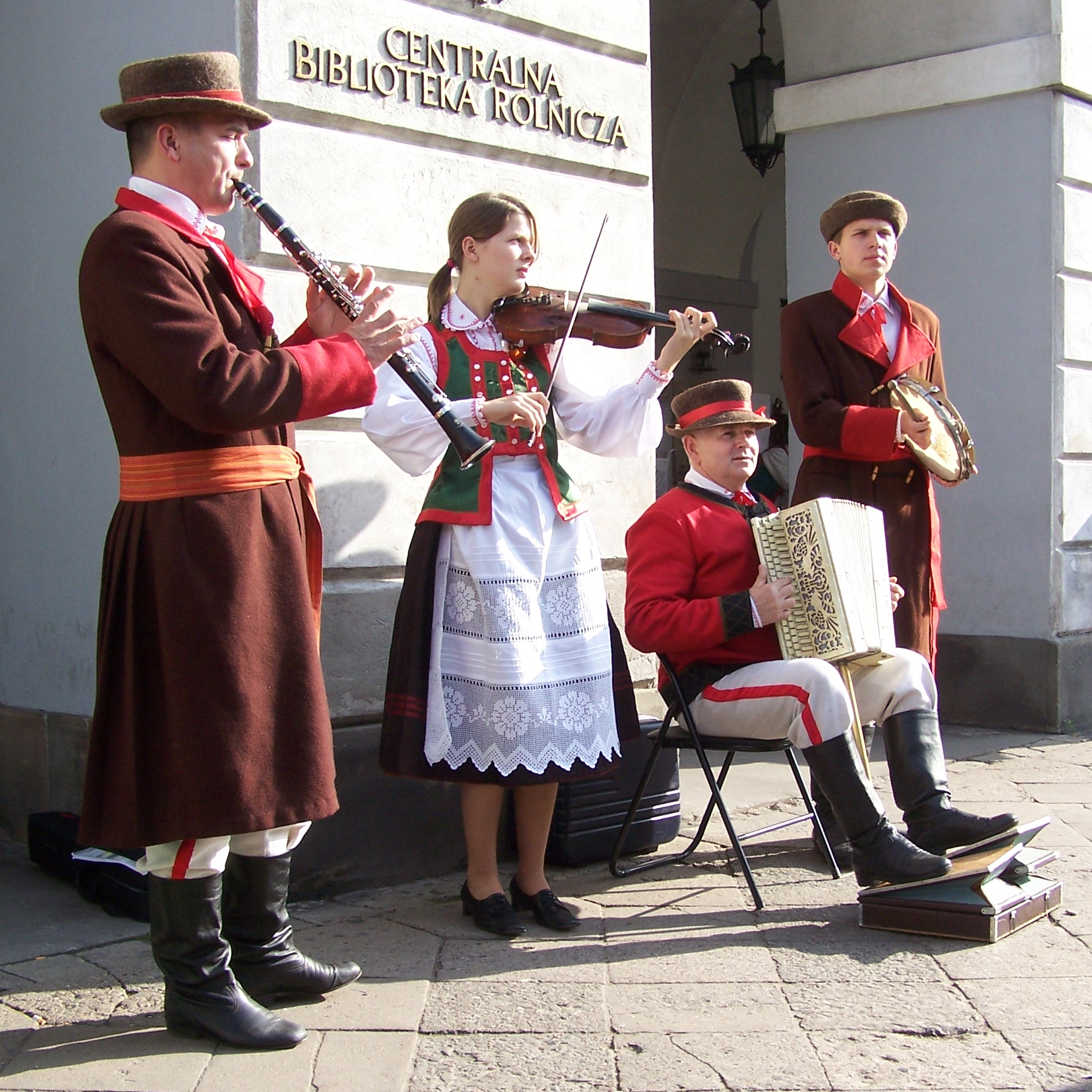
Kurpie folk group from Kadzidło

Because of their isolation, Kurpie folks—who were neither serfs nor nobles but reported directly to the king—took on a unique culture all their own.

=== A Kurpie house ===
Traditional Kurpie homes were made out of timber and thatched, with crosses or flags mounted on a gable roof. The roof's fascia and bargeboards often featured carved decorative ornaments, and were usually topped with heads of animals at the ridge. The interior of the house was sparse, the floor was wooden, and windows always contained six panes of glass. Shutters and doors were painted. In 1927, Adam Chetnik established an open-air museum in Nowogród which showcases traditional Kurpie homes and other elements of their culture.

=== Traditional costume ===
Although their costumes were similar, Kurpies in the north had one type of costume and Kurpies in the southern part of the region had another. For example, in the north, women wore red skirts with a green vest over a white linen blouse with some trim and always a necklace made of amber. Women in the south wore green skirts and employed more elaborate embroidery and needlework in their costume.

Kurpie men in the north wore long brown coats tied around the waist with a red sash. They wore white linen shirts and white trousers which are fastened at the bottom with straps from the Kurpie shoes which they wore. Men from the north can be distinguished from men in the south since men in the north wear dark brown top hats and men from the south wear small black caps.

There is some variation in the costume. For example, a man’s trousers could be grey or white, and women might wear a red or a white blouse.

=== Folk dance ===
Kurpie, like other Polish regions, has its own traditional dances, such as the "horse" (konik) where dancing men mimic a horse and rider.

=== Kurpie Palm Sunday ===
During this season, Kurpies delighted in making tall Easter Sunday palms out of small trees and decorating them with flowers and other ornaments in order to protect their houses from ghosts.

=== Easter ===
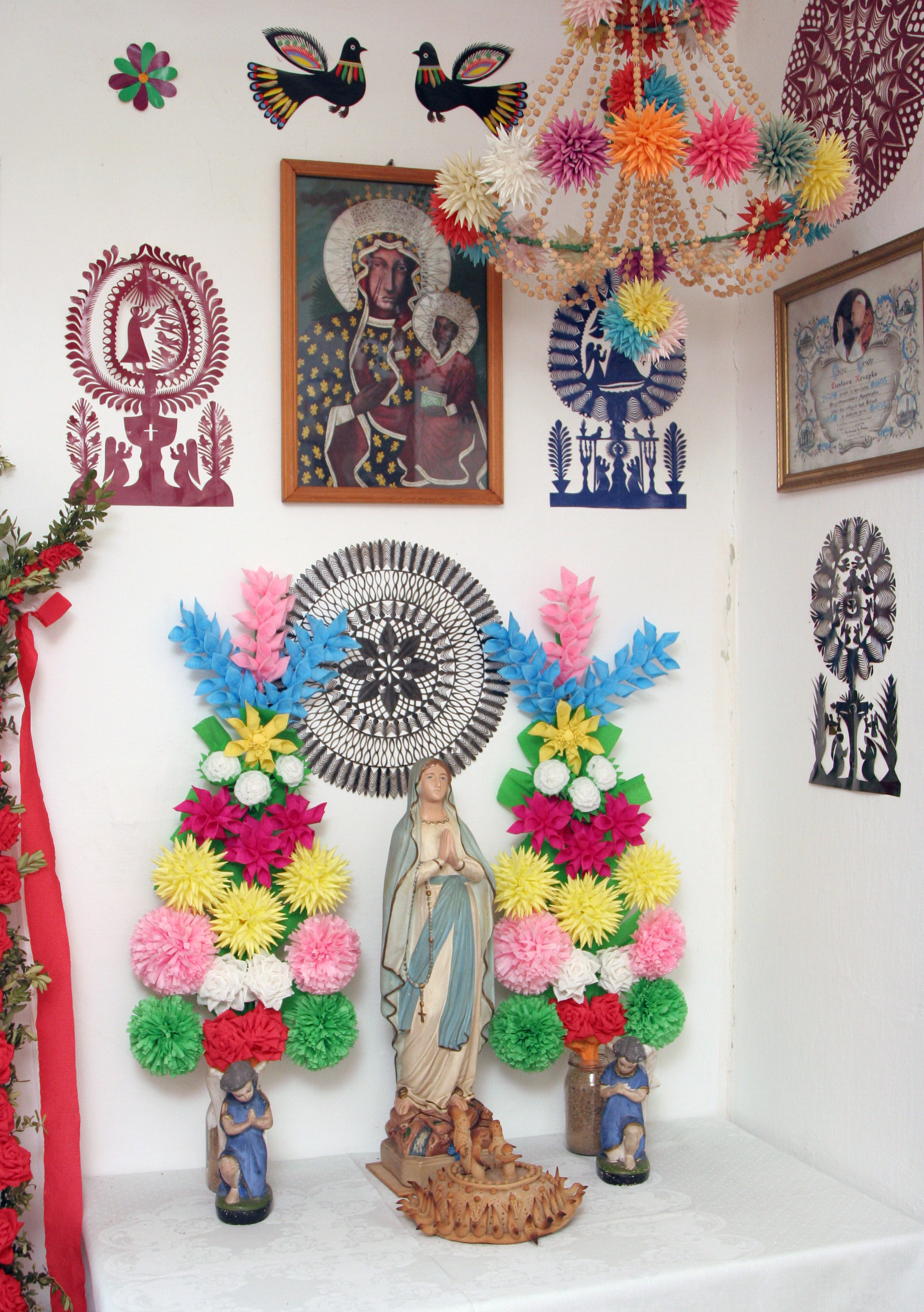
Kurpie paper cut-outs (wycinanki) and other decorations

Kurpie women were famous for their beautifully decorated Easter eggs, and cookies made in the shape of the Easter lamb.

=== Cut-outs ===
Kurpie women have always been famous for their paper cut-outs (wycinanki) of animals, geometric designs, flowers, and so on.

=== Smigus-Dingus ===
This custom was characterized by people sprinkling water over each other in celebration. The intent was to show your affection for the person being sprinkled, and therefore men generally took the lead in sprinkling women.

=== God’s day celebration ===
A celebration which is still popular today is a religious procession to various altars, with participants wearing their traditional costumes. The leaders of the procession bless the Kurpie lands as they proceed.

=== Harvest celebration ===
In August Kurpies collected grain and flowers and took them to church to be blessed.

=== Winter celebration ===
On 6 December a celebration was held praising the good fortune that the cattle had not been eaten by the wolves. However, wolves have long since disappeared from Kurpie.

=== Christmas ===
An embossed wafer (opłatek), featuring a religious scene, was shared with family members and with the cattle. Women placed hay under the table and children wandered the streets and sang Christmas carols in return for treats.

=== New Years celebration ===
Cookies were made in the shape of animals (called "bulls") and other cookies were made in the form of a circle with a bird shown on it (called "years"). Together, these cookies were hung from the ceiling.

=== Kadzidlańskie Wedding ===
The traditional Kurpie Kadzidlańskie Wedding is well known throughout Poland and includes dances, songs, chants and wedding ceremonies based on ancient wedding rituals.

=== Kurpie music ===
The music of Kurpie is very different from that of its neighbors. Over one thousand original Kurpie songs were recorded by the Polish priest, Władysław Skierkowski, in his book "Puszcza Kurpiowska w pieśni".

In Henryk M. Górecki ‘s third symphony, titled "Symphony of Sorrowful Songs", the first part of the symphony was inspired by Kurpie music.

== Kurpie today ==
From the days of forest living to the days of marginal farming, Kurpie today is vastly different than its traditional past. Since the end of World War II, education, migration, improved methods of farming, improvement of commerce, and infrastructure growth have brought Kurpie into the modern age.

== Gallery ==
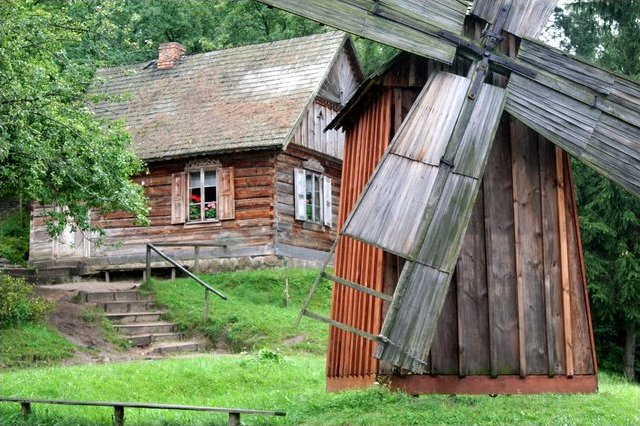
Windmill and home in Nowogród

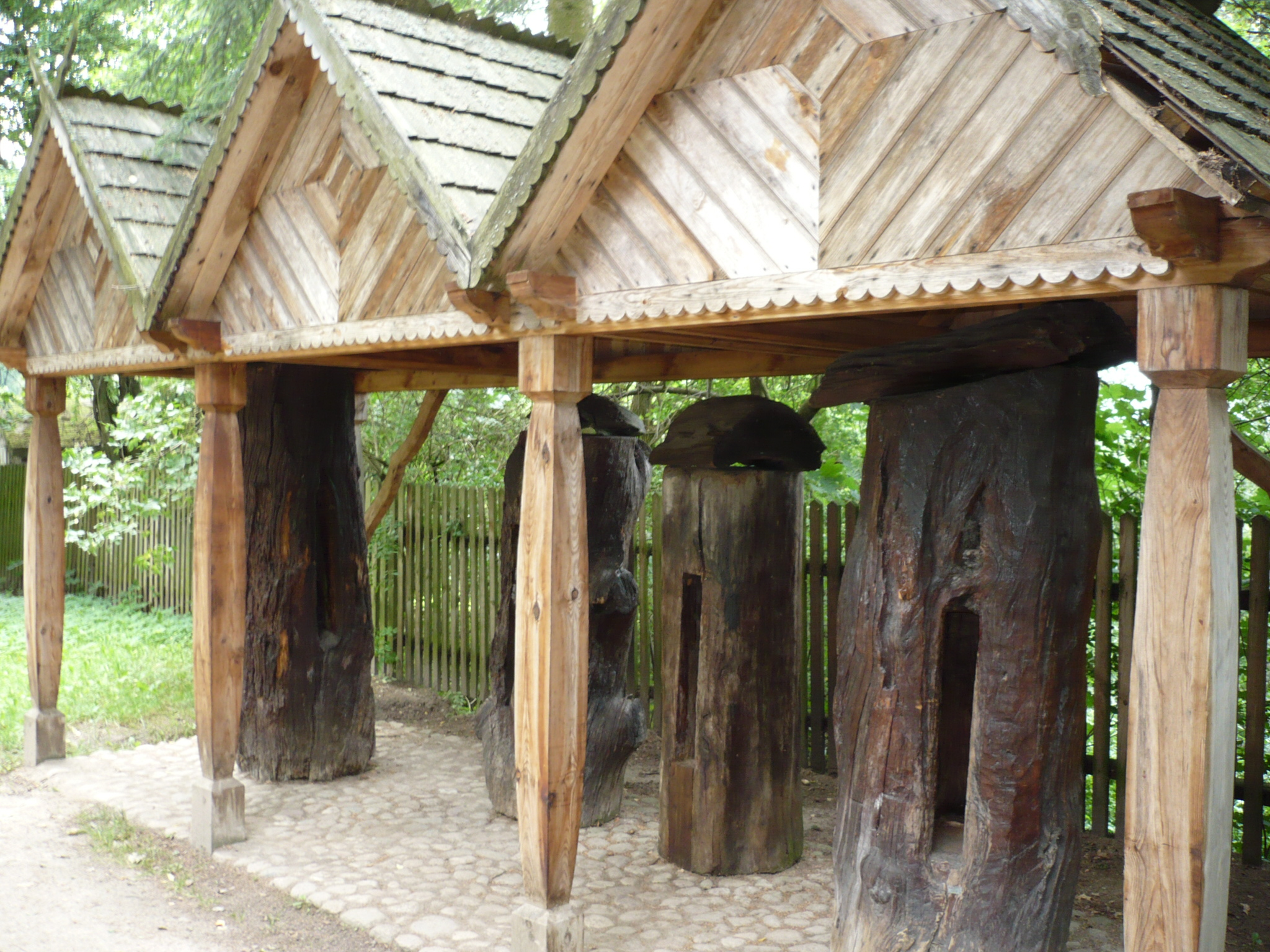
Kurpie beehive in Nowogród

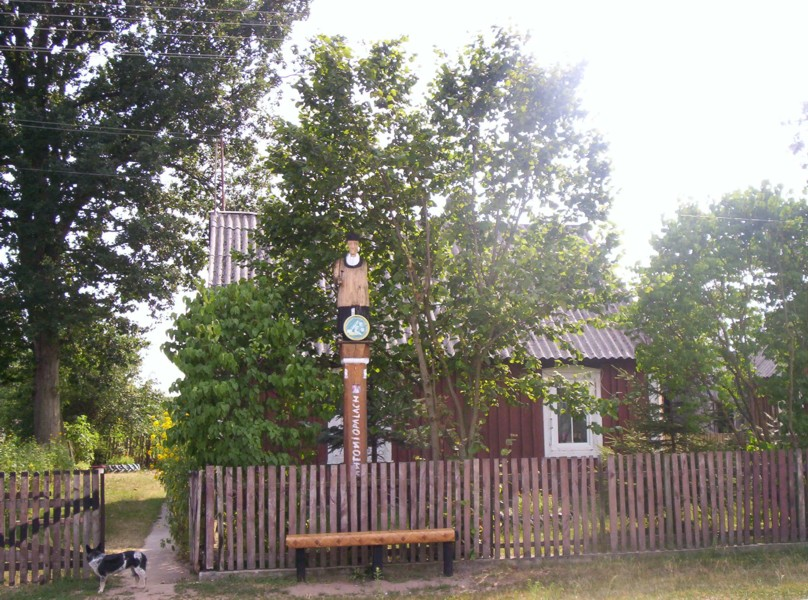
Kurpie house with decorations

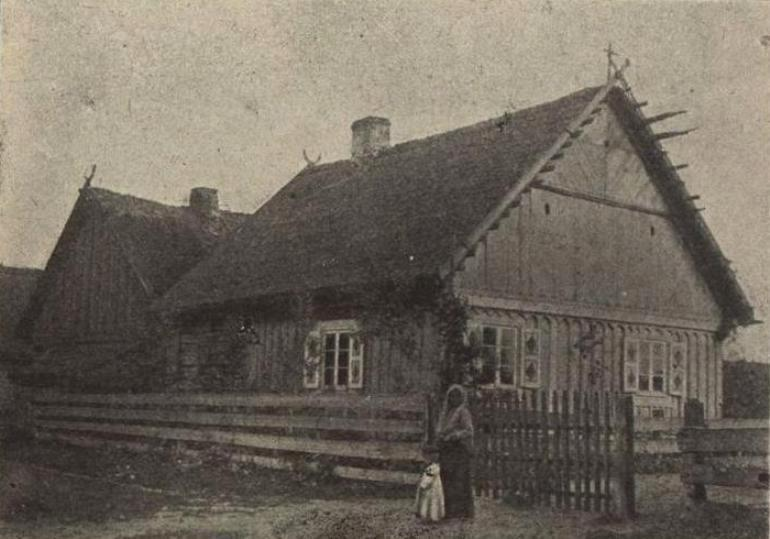
Kurpie house, 1913 photograph by Adam Chętnik

== See also ==
- Polish–Lithuanian Commonwealth
- Congress Poland
- Culture of Poland
- Kurpie Białe
