= Grądzkie =

Grądzkie may refer to the following places:

- Grądzkie, Masovian Voivodeship (east-central Poland)
- Grądzkie, Warmian-Masurian Voivodeship (north Poland)
- Grądzkie, West Pomeranian Voivodeship (north-west Poland)
