= Plewki =

Plewki may refer to the following places:

- Plewki, Ostrołęka County in Masovian Voivodeship (east-central Poland)
- Plewki, Wyszków County in Masovian Voivodeship (east-central Poland)
- Plewki, Podlaskie Voivodeship (north-east Poland)
- Plewki, Warmian-Masurian Voivodeship (north Poland)
