= Pupkowizna =

- Village
- Location within Poland
- Coordinates: 53°24′N 21°38′E
- Country: Poland
- Voivodeship: Masovian
- County: Ostrołęka
- Gmina: Łyse

Pupkowizna [pupkɔˈvizna] is a village in the administrative district of Gmina Łyse, within Ostrołęka County, Masovian Voivodeship, in east-central Poland.

== History ==
In 1921–1939, the village was located in the Białystok Voivodeship, in the Kolno County (since 1932 in the Ostrołęka County), in the Turośl Commune.

According to the General Census of Population of 1921, the village was inhabited by 326 people in 64 residential buildings. The village belonged to the Roman Catholic parish in the town of Łyse. It was subordinate to the District Court in Kolno and the District Court in Łomża; the relevant post office was located in the town of Łyse.

As a result of German aggression in September 1939, the village was occupied and until January 1945 it was annexed to the Third Reich and found itself in the structures of Landkreis Scharfenwiese (Ostrołęka) in the Ciechanów Regency (Regierungsbezirk Zichenau) of East Prussia.

In the years 1975–1998 the town administratively belonged to the Łomża Voivodeship.
