= Baba, Masovian Voivodeship =

Baba
- Village
- Location within Poland
- Coordinates: 53°18′N 21°36′E
- Country: Poland
- Voivodeship: Masovian
- County: Ostrołęka
- Gmina: Łyse

Baba [ˈbaba] is a village in the administrative district of Gmina Łyse, within Ostrołęka County, Masovian Voivodeship, in east-central Poland.
