= Władysław Skierkowski =

Polish priest

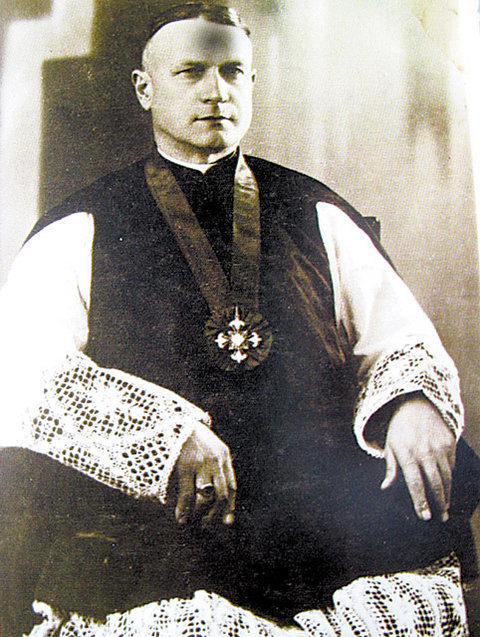

Władysław Skierkowski (12 March 1886 – 20 August 1941) was a Polish priest born in the peasant village of Głużek. He was responsible for studying and collecting the folk music of the Kurpie region of Poland.

== Ordination ==
As a youth Skierkowski was determined to become a priest, so he volunteered to serve as organist in the church seminary in Płock, which eventually led to his admittance to the seminary. He was later ordained 23 June 1912 and, after serving as vicar in Dzierzgowo, he was reassigned to a church in the town of Myszyniec.

His pastoral travels by foot or horse from Myszyniec to the town of Chorzele, a distance of 30 kilometers, led him through the primeval swamps and the dark forest of the Kurpie wilderness. It was only during World War I when he was forced to flee into the Kurpie forest and live with the peasants in their huts and share their customs that he became enthralled with the music, customs, and dialect of the forest dwellers.

== Collecting folk songs ==
From 1913 to his death in 1941, Skierkowski collected thousands of Kurpie folk songs including engagement and wedding songs, love songs, ballads, orphan songs, family songs, comic songs, soldier songs, shepherd songs, the annual song, as well as songs of the harvest. His collection of songs was published in 1928 in his book “The Kurpie Forest in Song“ (Puszcza Kurpiowska w pieśni).

== Capture by the Nazis ==
During World War II Skierkowski attempted to avoid capture by the Germans, but was finally caught and arrested during the night of 6 March 1941 and taken to Soldau concentration camp near the town of Działdowo. His death was reported as 20 August 1941, with the cause of death listed as pneumonia. He was 55 years old.

== See also ==
- Kurpie
- Nazi crimes against ethnic Poles
