= Gmina Łyse =

Gmina Łyse Łyse Commune
- Gmina
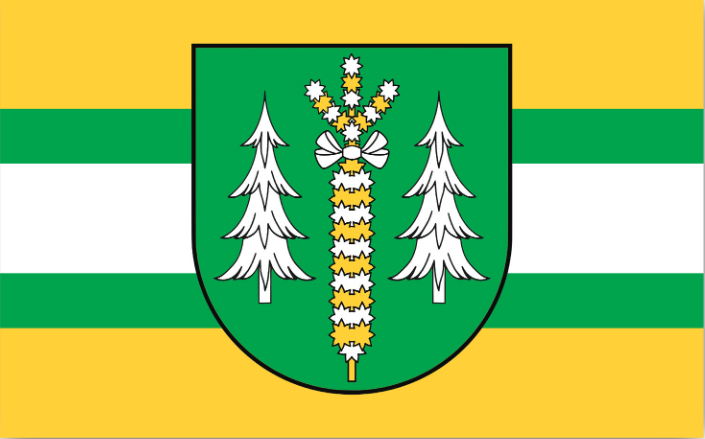
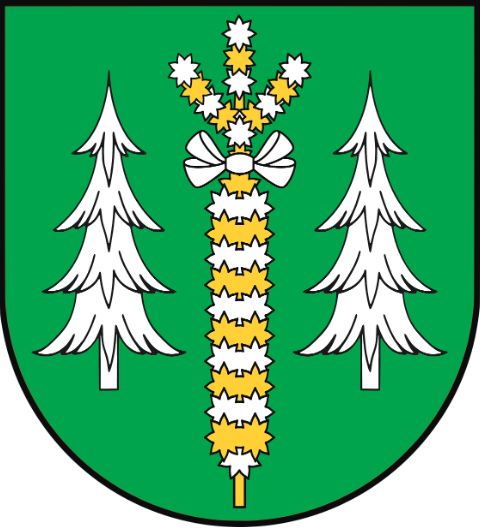
- Flag Coat of arms

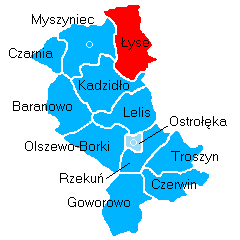

- Location within Poland
- Coordinates (Łyse): 53°21′51″N 21°33′54″E
- Country: Poland
- Voivodeship: Masovian
- County: Ostrołęka County
- Seat: Łyse

Area
  - Total: 246.45 km^{2} (95.15 sq mi)

Population (2011)
  - Total: 8,394
  - Density: 34.06/km^{2} (88.21/sq mi)
- Website: https://www.gminalyse.pl/

Gmina Łyse is a rural gmina (administrative district) in Ostrołęka County, Masovian Voivodeship, in east-central Poland. Its seat is the village of Łyse, which lies approximately 31 kilometres (19 mi) north of Ostrołęka and 132 km (82 mi) north-east of Warsaw.

The gmina covers an area of 246.45 square kilometres (95.2 sq mi), and as of 2006 its total population is 7,908 (8,394 in 2011).

== Villages ==
Gmina Łyse contains the villages and settlements of Antonia, Baba, Dawia, Dęby, Dudy Puszczańskie, Grądzkie, Klenkor, Łączki, Lipniki, Łyse, Piątkowizna, Plewki, Pupkowizna, Serafin, Szafranki, Tartak, Tyczek, Warmiak, Wejdo, Wyżega, Zalas and Złota Góra.

== Neighbouring gminas ==
Gmina Łyse is bordered by the gminas of Kadzidło, Myszyniec, Pisz, Rozogi, Turośl and Zbójna.
