= Dawia =

- Village
- Location within Poland
- Coordinates: 53°20′N 21°37′E
- Country: Poland
- Voivodeship: Masovian
- County: Ostrołęka
- Gmina: Łyse
- Population (approx.): 60

Dawia [ˈdavja] is a village in the administrative district of Gmina Łyse, within Ostrołęka County, Masovian Voivodeship, in east-central Poland.
