= Dudy Puszczańskie =

- Village
- Location within Poland
- Coordinates: 53°27′N 21°30′E
- Country: Poland
- Voivodeship: Masovian
- County: Ostrołęka
- Gmina: Łyse

Dudy Puszczańskie [ˈdudɨ puʂˈt͡ʂaɲskʲɛ] is a village in the administrative district of Gmina Łyse, within Ostrołęka County, Masovian Voivodeship, in east-central Poland.
