= Złota Góra, Ostrołęka County =

Złota Góra
- Village
- Location within Poland
- Coordinates: 53°19′N 21°37′E
- Country: Poland
- Voivodeship: Masovian
- County: Ostrołęka
- Gmina: Łyse

Złota Góra [ˈzwɔta ˈɡura] is a village in the administrative district of Gmina Łyse, within Ostrołęka County, Masovian Voivodeship, in east-central Poland.
