= Tartak, Ostrołęka County =

Tartak
- Village
- Location within Poland
- Coordinates: 53°18′40″N 21°30′9″E
- Country: Poland
- Voivodeship: Masovian
- County: Ostrołęka
- Gmina: Łyse

Tartak [ˈtartak] is a village in the administrative district of Gmina Łyse, within Ostrołęka County, Masovian Voivodeship, in east-central Poland.
