= Zalas, Ostrołęka County =

Zalas
- Village
- Location within Poland
- Coordinates: 53°26′N 21°34′E
- Country: Poland
- Voivodeship: Masovian
- County: Ostrołęka
- Gmina: Łyse

Zalas [ˈzalas] is a village in the administrative district of Gmina Łyse, within Ostrołęka County, Masovian Voivodeship, in east-central Poland.
