= Łyse, Masovian Voivodeship =

Łyse
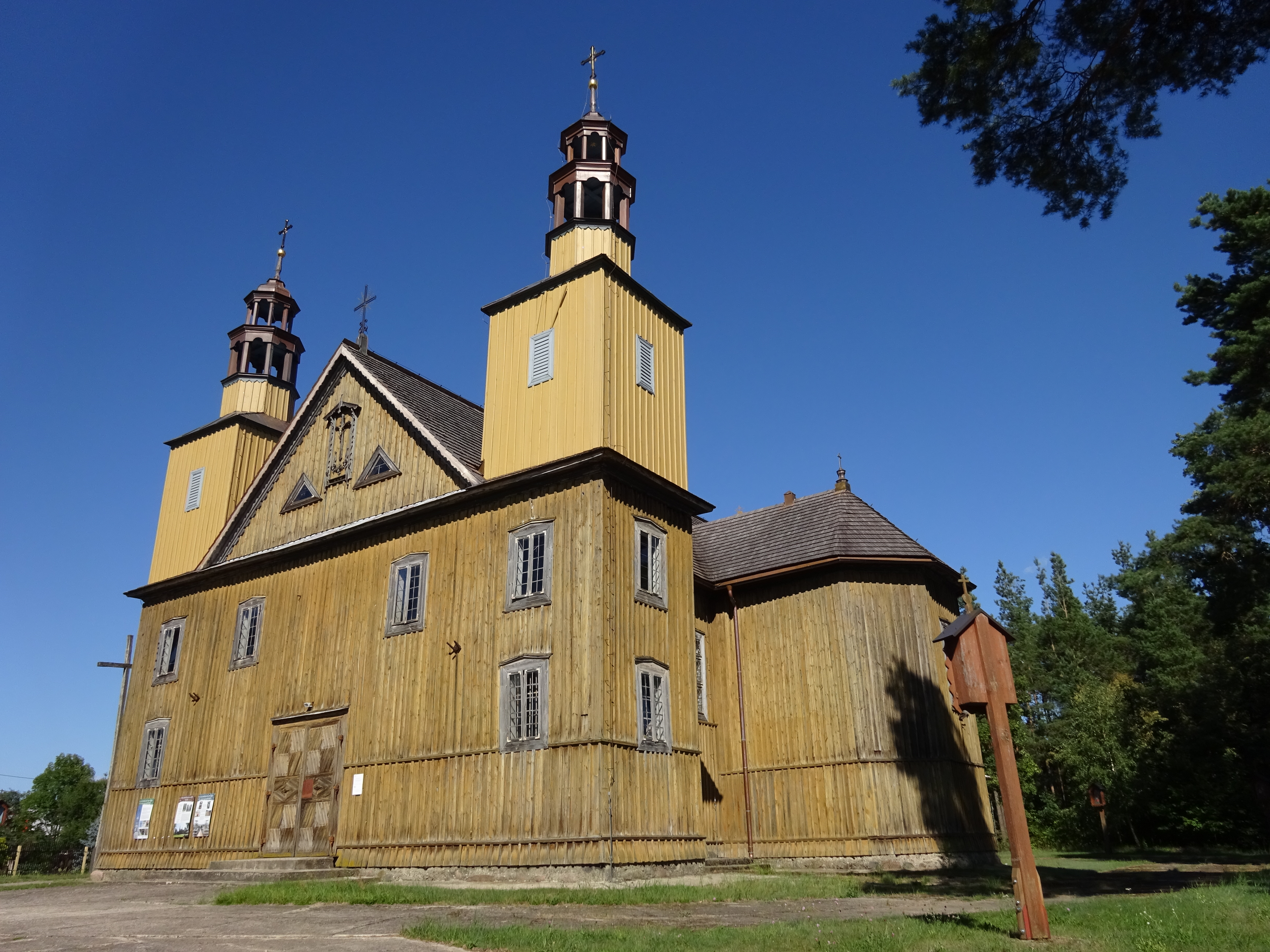
- Church of Saint Anne

- Location within Poland
- Coordinates: 53°21′51″N 21°33′54″E
- Country: Poland
- Voivodeship: Masovian
- County: Ostrołęka
- Gmina: Łyse

Population (2006)
  - Total: 2,000
- Time zone: UTC+1 (CET)
  - Summer (DST): UTC+2 (CEST)
- Postal code: 07-437
- Car plates: WOS

Łyse [ˈwɨsɛ] is a village in Poland, situated in the Masovian Voivodeship, in Ostrołęka County, and in Gmina Łyse, by the road 645 between Myszyniec and Nowogród.

In 1975–1998, Łyse belonged to the Ostrołęka Voivodeship.
