= Łączki, Masovian Voivodeship =

Village in Masovian Voivodeship, Poland

Łączki
- Village
- Location within Poland
- Coordinates: 53°28′N 21°34′E
- Country: Poland
- Voivodeship: Masovian
- County: Ostrołęka
- Gmina: Łyse

Łączki [ˈwɔnt͡ʂki] is a village in the administrative district of Gmina Łyse, within Ostrołęka County, Masovian Voivodeship, in north-eastern Poland.
