= Tyczek =

- Village
- Location within Poland
- Coordinates: 53°25′N 21°31′E
- Country: Poland
- Voivodeship: Masovian
- County: Ostrołęka
- Gmina: Łyse
- Time zone: UTC+1 (CET)
  - Summer (DST): UTC+2 (CEST)

Tyczek [ˈtɨt͡ʂɛk] is a village in the administrative district of Gmina Łyse, within Ostrołęka County, Masovian Voivodeship, in east-central Poland.

Five Polish citizens were murdered by Nazi Germany in the village during World War II.
