= Lipniki, Ostrołęka County =

Lipniki
- Village
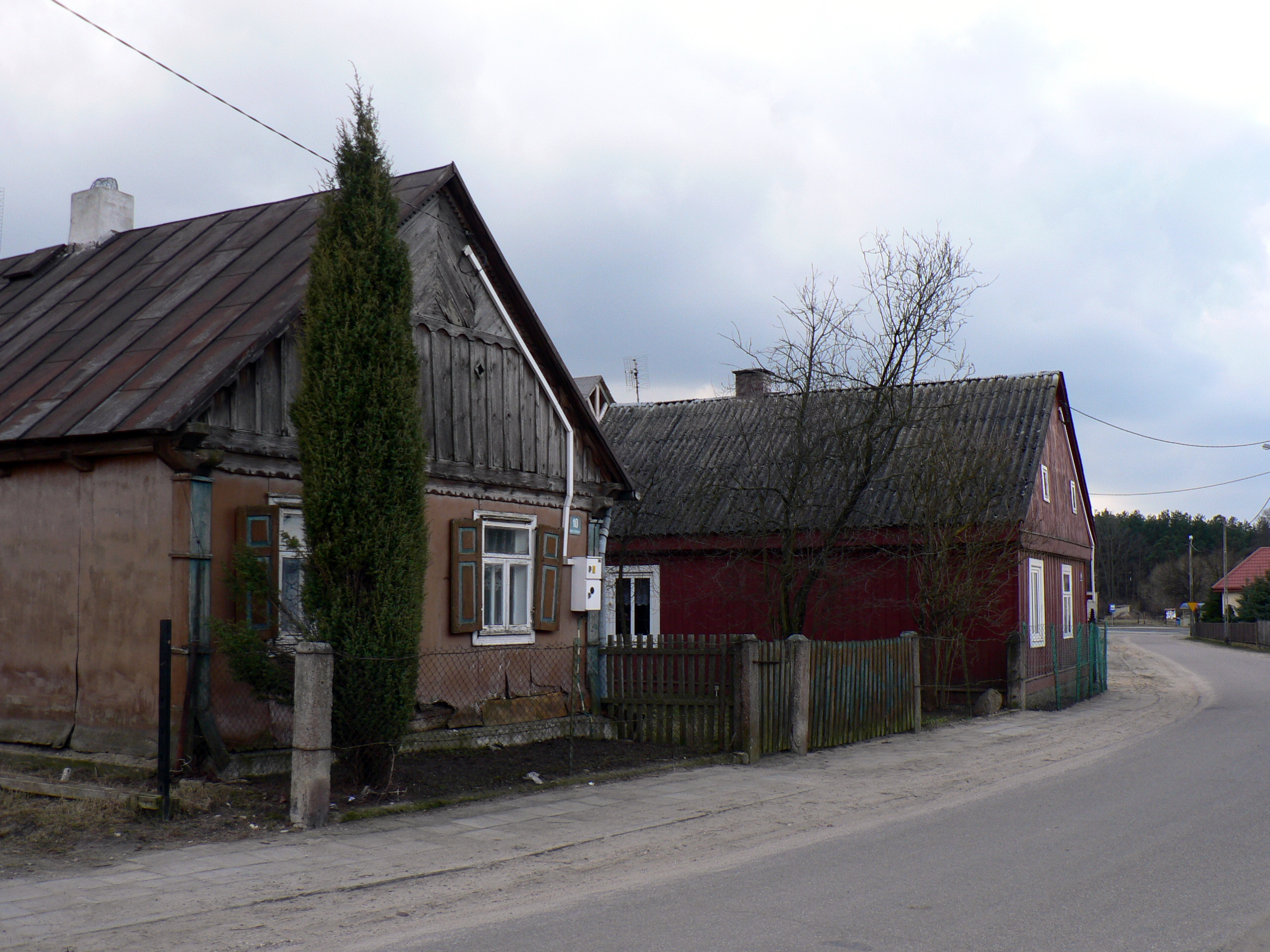

- Location within Poland
- Coordinates: 53°19′N 21°31′E
- Country: Poland
- Voivodeship: Masovian
- County: Ostrołęka
- Gmina: Łyse

Population
  - Total: 1,152
- Time zone: UTC+1 (CET)
  - Summer (DST): UTC+2 (CEST)
- Website: http://www.lipniki.yoyo.pl

Lipniki (Polish pronunciation: [lipˈɲikʲi]) is a village in the administrative district of Gmina Łyse, within Ostrołęka County, Masovian Voivodeship, in east-central Poland. Established in 1663 by Wiśniewski, a settler from Piotrków Trybunalski, Lipniki is the oldest historically documented village in the Kurpie region of Poland.

== Name ==
The name "Lipniki" most likely comes from the Polish "lipa," or linden tree, which grow in abundance in the village and environs. Apparently Wiśniewski was inspired by the pleasant odor of the linden trees and named the settlement accordingly. There are however those who claim that the name comes from a variety of shoes made from linden wood called "Lipnioki."

== Historical structures ==
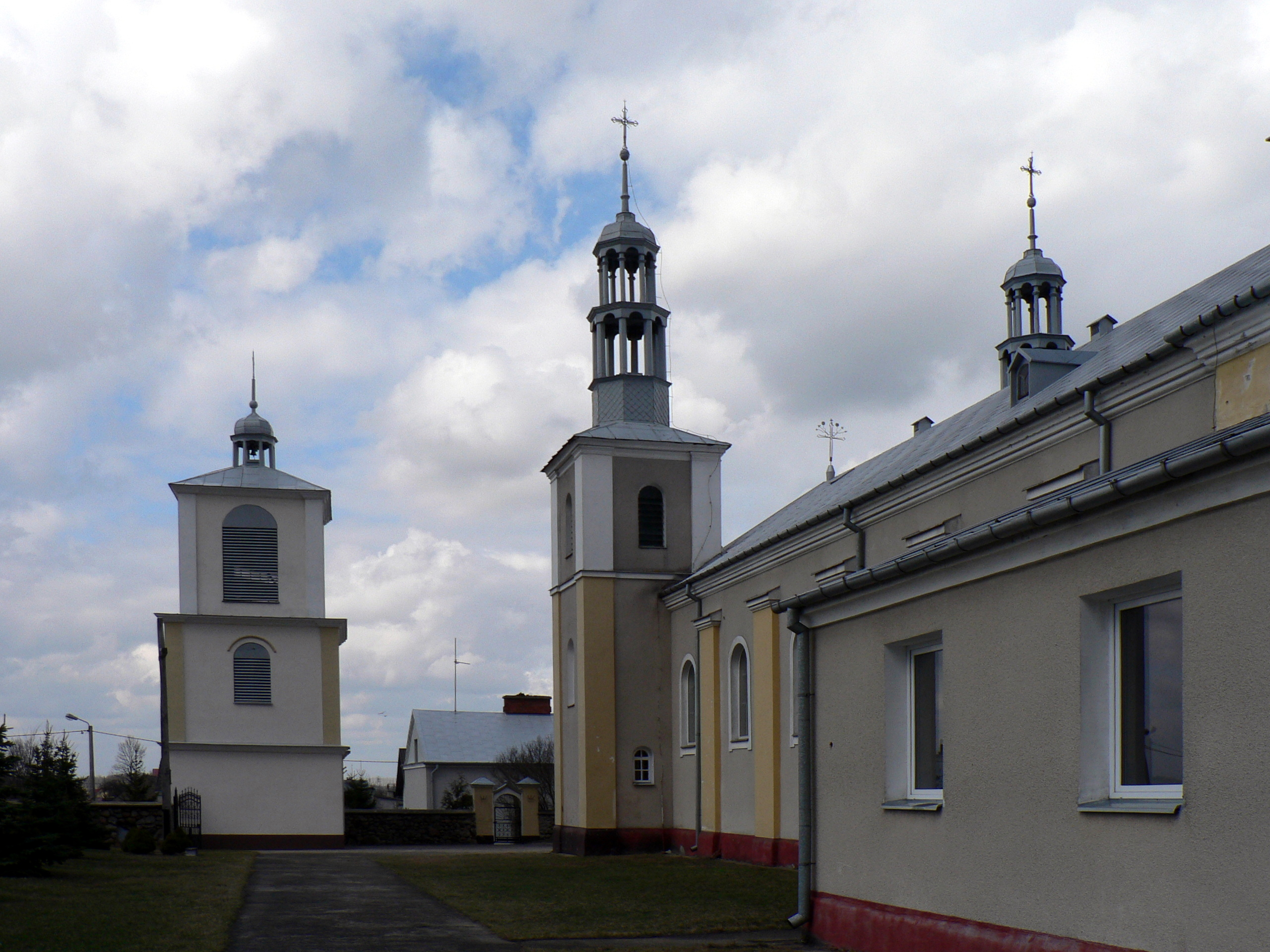
Church of the Sacred Heart

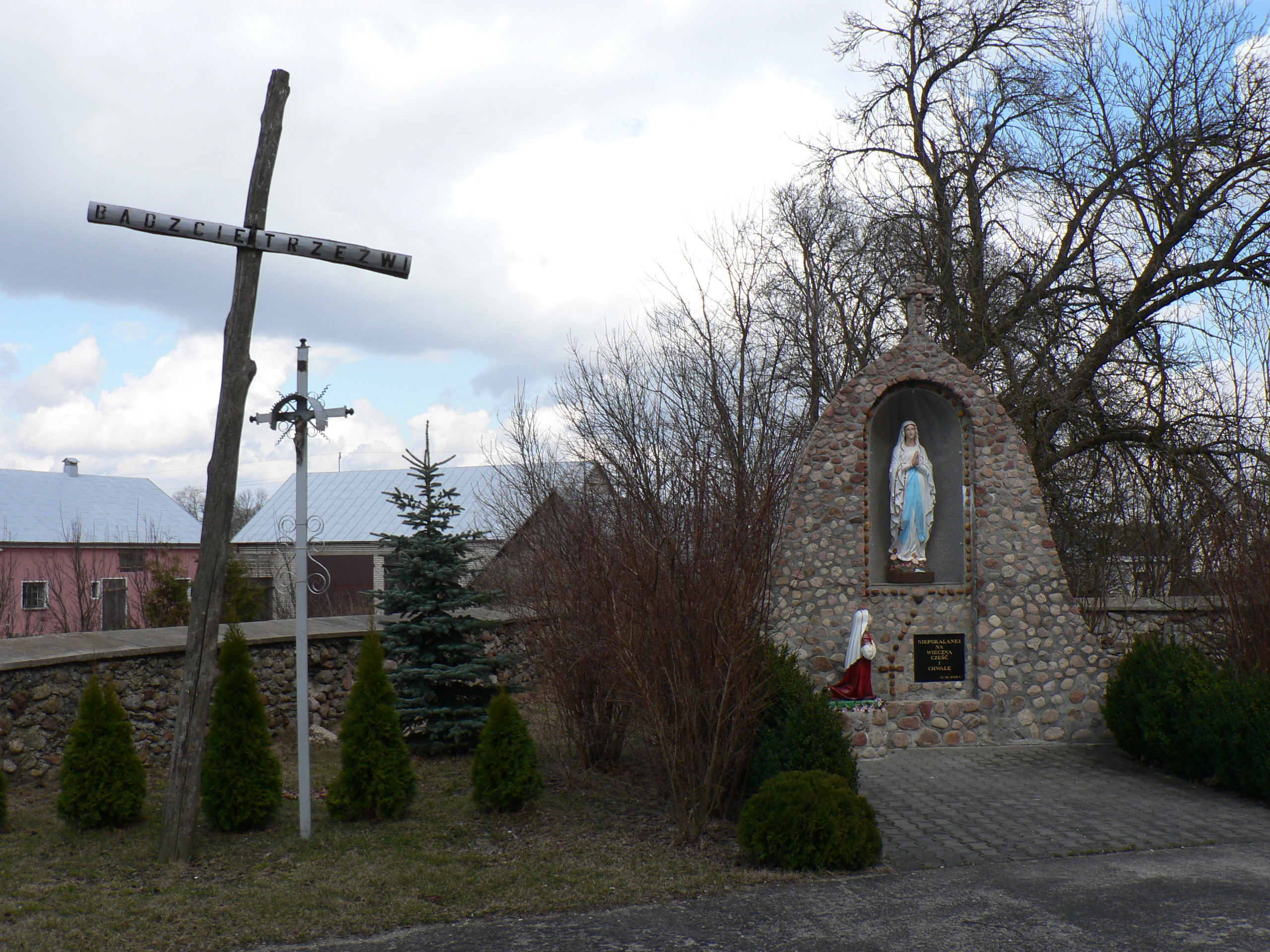
Churchyard

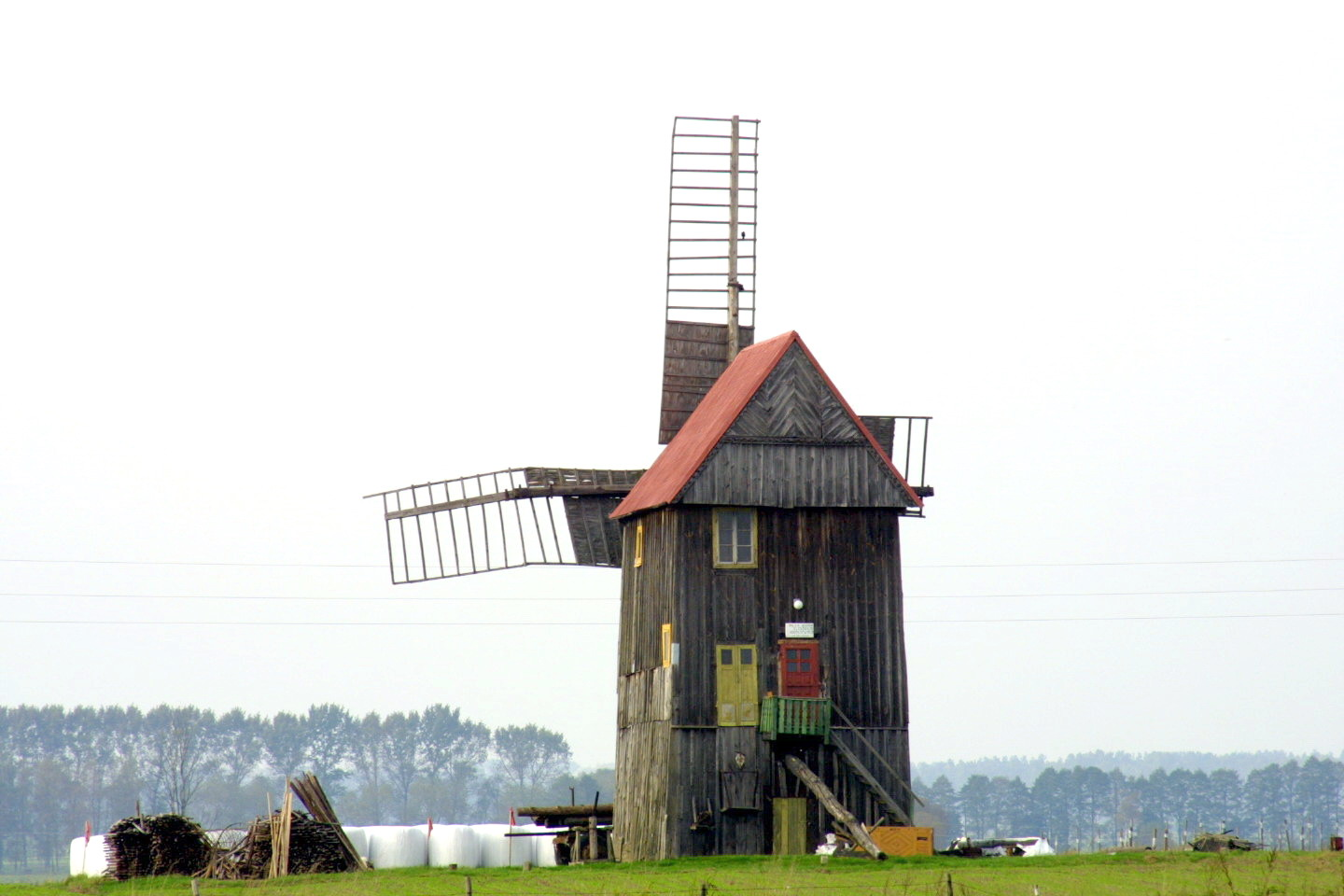
19th Century Windmill

Among structures considered historically significant are:

- Sacred Heart Parish Church (built 1837–1843 in neo-Baroque style)
- Active Cemetery (chapel, gate, and wrought-iron crosses all dating to the 19th Century)
- Cholera Cemetery (no longer active) from the 19th Century
- 2 19th-Century wooden windmills
- 19th-Century Figure of Saint Roch

== History ==
The founder of Lipniki was a man named Wiśniewski, supposedly a nobleman, who was an escapee from the settlement of Piotrków Trybunalski. Having escaped either from a court sentence or from vicious rumors, he established a settlement in 1663. 10 years later he applied to the Starostwo for the right to establish the settlement as the village of Lipniki. He also had to appeal to the Royal Beekeeping Society and accept the so-called "Prawo Bartne" or "Beekeeper's Laws." This was a set of laws governing the production and sale of honey, wax, and related products, which were a chief product of this region and were particularly valuable to the noble class at the time.

Five Polish citizens were murdered by Nazi Germany in the village during World War II.
