= Plewki, Ostrołęka County =

Plewki
- Village
- Location within Poland
- Coordinates: 53°17′53″N 21°36′25″E
- Country: Poland
- Voivodeship: Masovian
- County: Ostrołęka
- Gmina: Łyse

Plewki (Polish pronunciation: [ˈplɛfki]) is a village in the administrative district of Gmina Łyse, within Ostrołęka County, Masovian Voivodeship, in east-central Poland.
