= Adam Chętnik =

Polish ethnographer

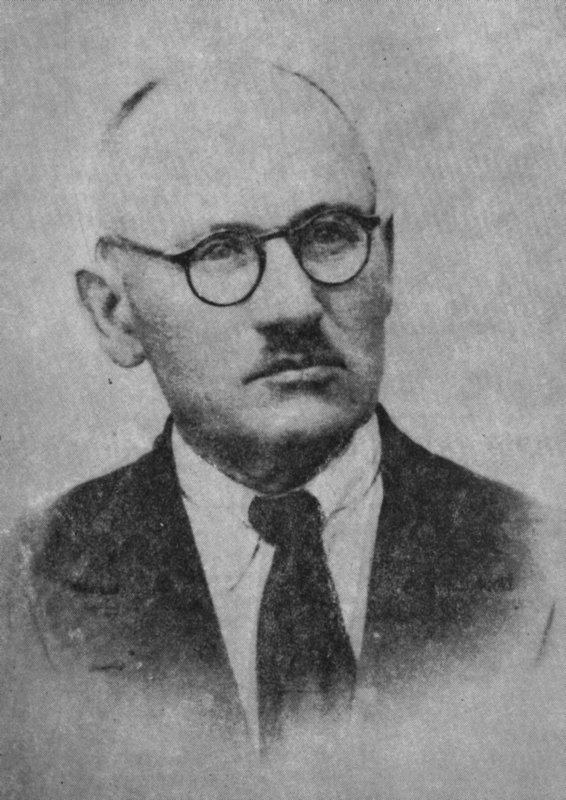
- Born: December 20, 1885; Nowogród, Congress Poland
- Died: May 29, 1967 (aged 81); Warsaw, Polish People's Republic
- Occupations: Ethnograf, museolog, social activist, politician
- Political party: Popular National Union
- Awards: Order of Polonia Restituta, Cross of Merit

Adam Chętnik (Polish pronunciation: [ˈadam ˈxɛntɲik]; born 20 December 1885 in Nowogród; died 29 May 1967 in Warsaw) was a Polish ethnographer who studied the Kurpie. He is the author of several books on the Kurpie residing in Puszcza Zielona. In 1927 he founded Skansen Kurpiowski in Nowogród, an open-air museum dedicated to Kurpie culture. He published over 100 scholarly works. He was also an elected deputy to the Sejm, as well as a member of the Polish Academy of Learning.

In the first years of the independence of Poland, with the establishment of the Polish Second Republic he was a member of the Sejm of the 1st term (1922–1927) on behalf of the Popular National Union. As a member of parliament from the Łomża region, he sat on committees dealing with regional affairs: forest management, regulation of the Narew River, economic and educational issues, and defended the interests of the region by submitting motions and parliamentary interpellations. After the end of the Sejm term, he withdrew from political activity and devoted himself to scientific work.

== Works ==
- Puszcza Kurpiowska, 1913
- Chata Kurpiowska, 1915
- Życie Puszczańskie Kurpiów
- Mazurskim szlakiem, 1939
- monografie Nowogrodu, Myszyńca, Dąbrówki, Opęchowa.
- Kurpie
- Z Kurpiowskich obozów
- Obrazki i gadki
- Krótki przewodnik po Kurpiach
- Kalendarzyk zwyczajów i obrzędów ludu kurpiowskiego
- O bursztynie i przemyśle bursztyniarskim
