= Nowogród =

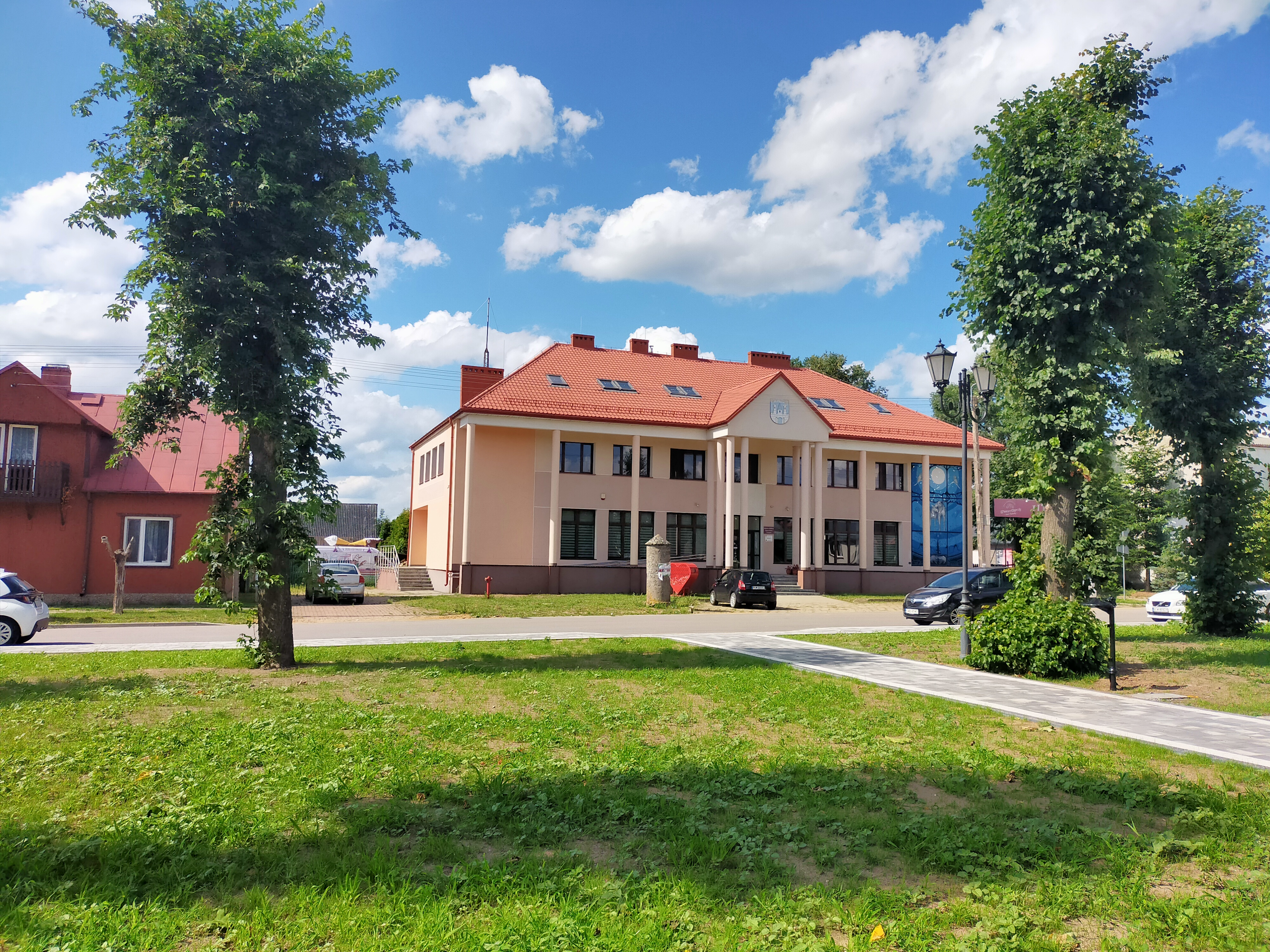
- Town hall

- Coat of arms

- Location within Poland
- Coordinates: 53°13′35″N 21°52′46″E
- Country: Poland
- Voivodeship: Podlaskie
- County: Łomża
- Gmina: Nowogród
- Town rights: 1427

Area
  - Total: 20.55 km^{2} (7.93 sq mi)

Population (2006)
  - Total: 2,014
  - Density: 98.00/km^{2} (253.8/sq mi)
- Postal code: 18-414
- Website: http://www.nowogrod.com

Nowogród [nɔˈvɔɡrut] is a small town in northeastern Poland, located about 13 kilometres (8 miles) away from the city of Łomża, Łomża County, Podlaskie Voivodeship, with 1,998 inhabitants (2004). It is centered on the area known as Skansen Kurpiowski which is an open-air museum, with several examples of mostly 19th century architecture from the region of Kurpie. The museum is dedicated to local Kurpie culture and is a popular folk tourist attraction. It was established by Adam Chętnik in 1927, and now features over 3000 items.

The river Narew flows through the town and has a myriad of views from the hills amongst it. The town's landmark is a World War II tank that stands overlooking the Narew river from atop a hill.

While contemporary Nowogród lies on a hill along the Narew river, the ancient gord was located at the confluence of the Narew and the Pisa. In late Middle Ages, Nowogrod used to be one of the most important towns of the Duchy of Mazovia. It was the seat of a royal castellany.

== History ==
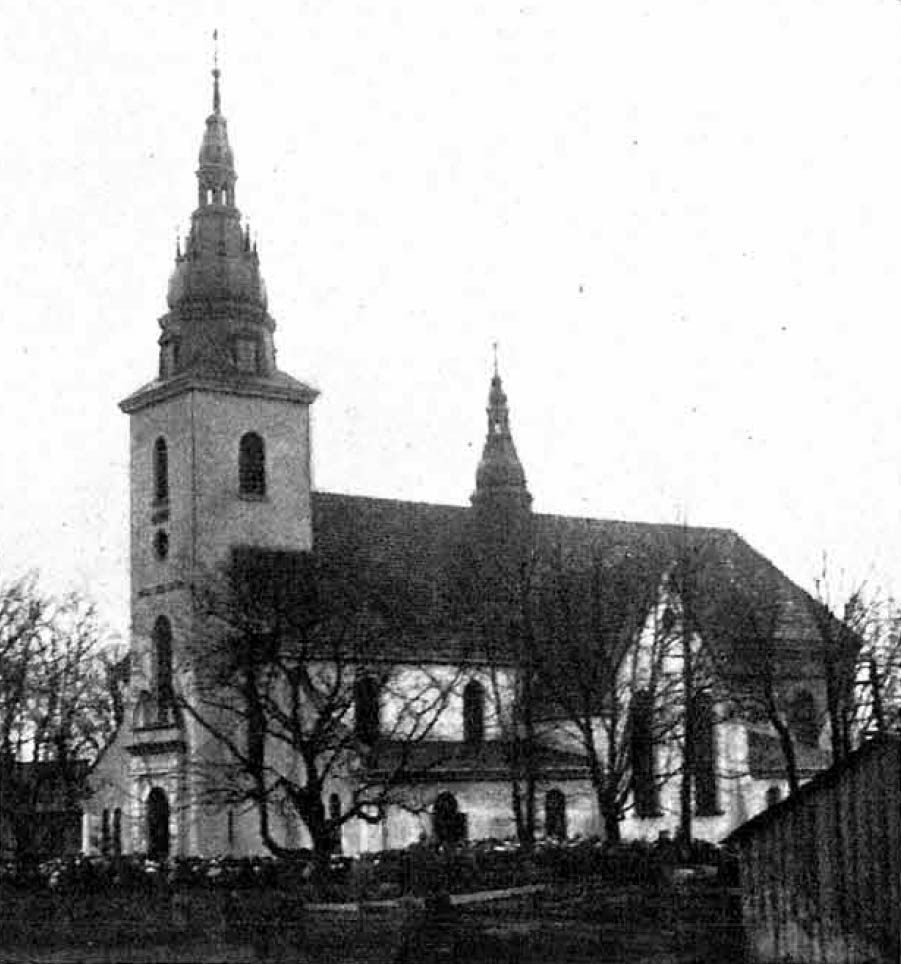
Early-20th-century view of the Church of the Nativity

The history of Nowogród dates back to the 9th century, as archaeologists found several objects, such as axes and tools, which date back to that period. Some time probably in the 12th century, the gord was moved on the high bank of the Narew, and at that time it was probably named Nowogrod. By early 14th century, it already was the seat of a castellany; on Nowogrod’s stamp from 1320, a Latin inscription Signum Novogrodensis is visible.

Since the area of Nowogród was located near the border with Lithuania and Yotvingians, it was frequently raided by the warring neighbours. In 1355, the gord became property of Siemowit III, Duke of Masovia, who in 1375 handed it to his son Janusz I of Warsaw. Janusz I founded here a brick castle, built in the location of a wooden construction. The castle became one of residences of the Dukes of Mazovia. Nowogrod received town charter in 1427. It was a royal town, administratively located in the Łomża County in the Łomża Land in the Masovian Voivodeship in the Greater Poland Province. It enjoyed a number of privileges, especially during the period known as Polish Golden Age, when it was an important center of trade, commerce and honey-making. The period of prosperity ended during the Swedish invasion of Poland (1655–1660). The town was ransacked and burned to the ground, never recovering from the destruction.

In 1794, during the Kosciuszko Uprising, a battle between Poles and Russians took place near Nowogród. Also, a skirmish took place here during the November Uprising. Following the unsuccessful January Uprising, it was deprived of its town charter in 1869, which was eventually restored in 1927.

During the German Invasion of Poland, which started World War II in September 1939, heavy fighting between Poles and the advancing Wehrmacht took place here, leaving Nowogród almost completely destroyed.

== Sights ==
Nowogrod has a Roman Catholic parish church, which dates back to the 15th century. Burned and destroyed several times, the church was renovated in 1980-82. There also is a cemetery of Polish soldiers who fell in the Polish-Soviet war of 1920, and a monument dedicated to them in 1923.

One of the few remaining gravestones. Note the photograph at its base.

There is also an old Jewish cemetery located on a hill on Polegluch St. It was established about 1778. It was nearly destroyed during WWII and there are only a few remaining gravestones. There is an active restoration project sponsored in part by descendants in the U.S. that has cleared some of the vegetation and installed an information sign. The information sign was funded in part by Gwyneth Paltrow.

== Transport ==
Vovoideship roads 648 and 645 bypass Nowogród to the south. These roads connect Nowogród to Łomza to the east and to Myszyniec in the west.

The nearest railway station is in Ostrołęka.

== Gallery ==
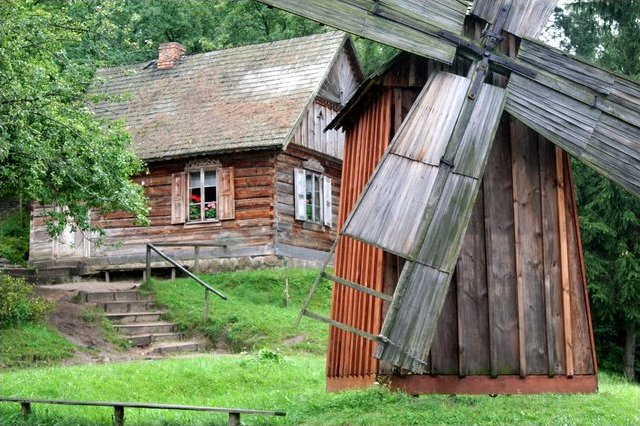
Kurpie home and windmill at Skansen Kurpiowski

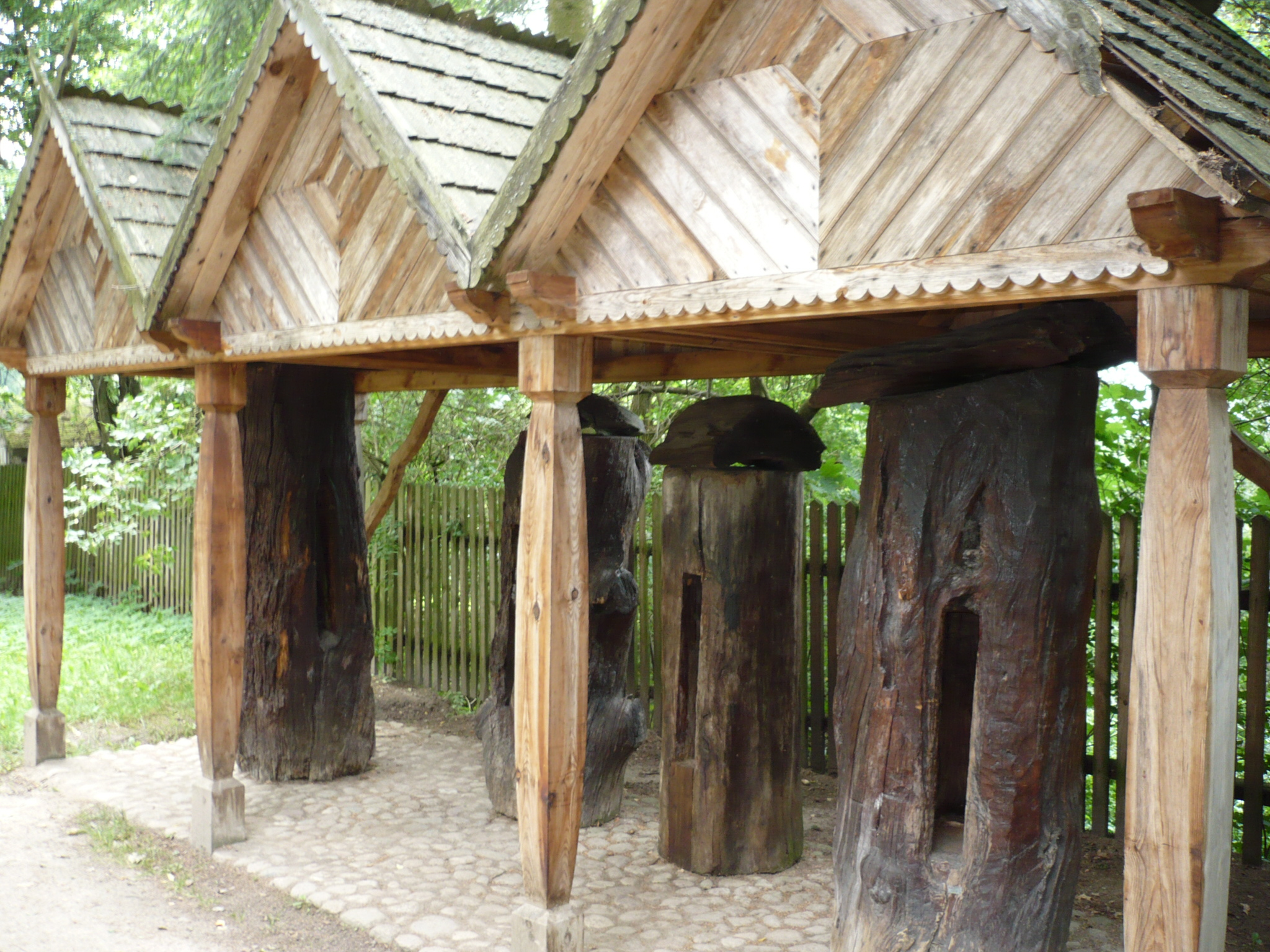
Kurpie beehive at Skansen Kurpiowski

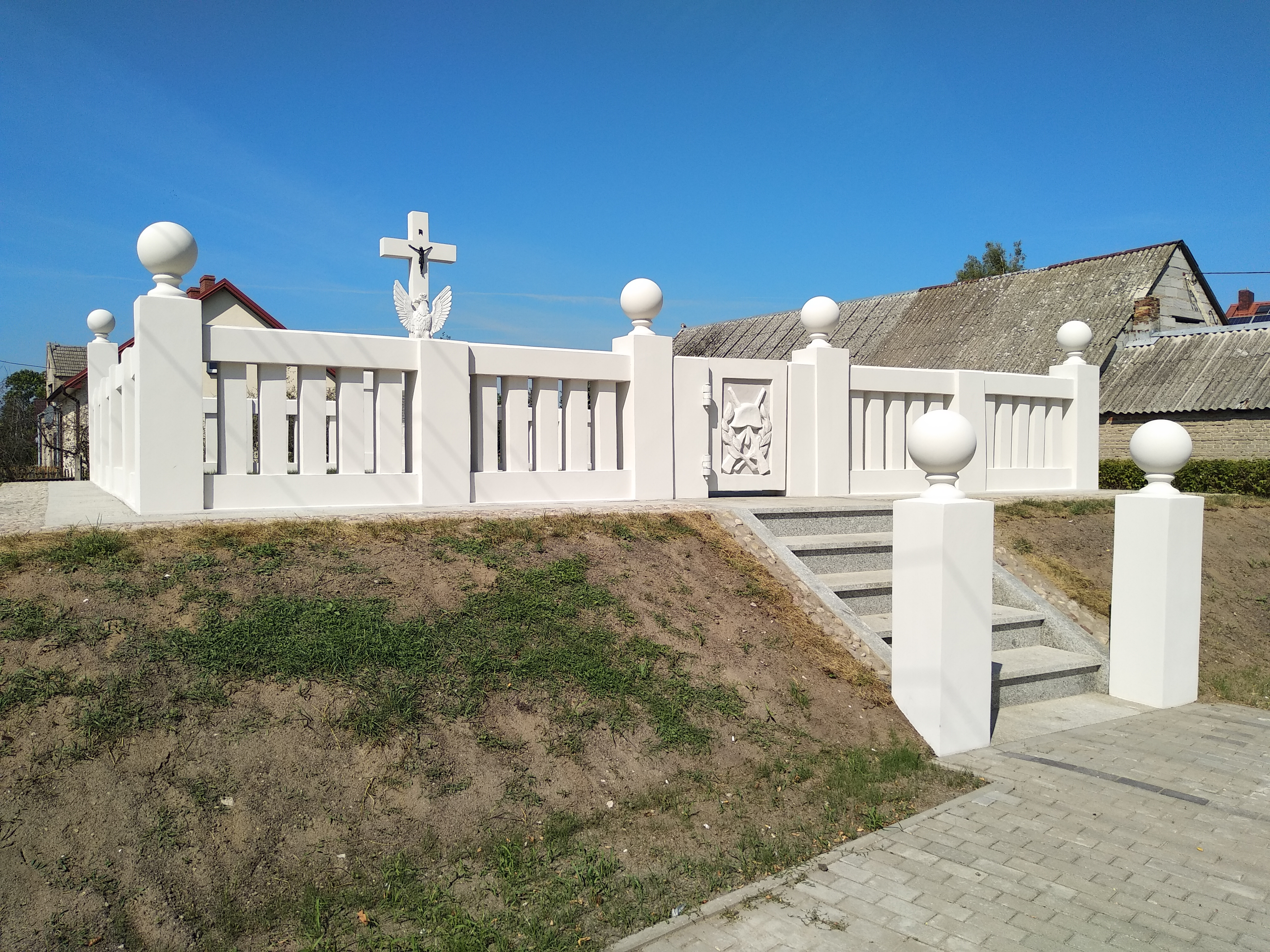
Polish war cemetery
