= Myszyniec =

Town in Masovian Voivodeship, Poland

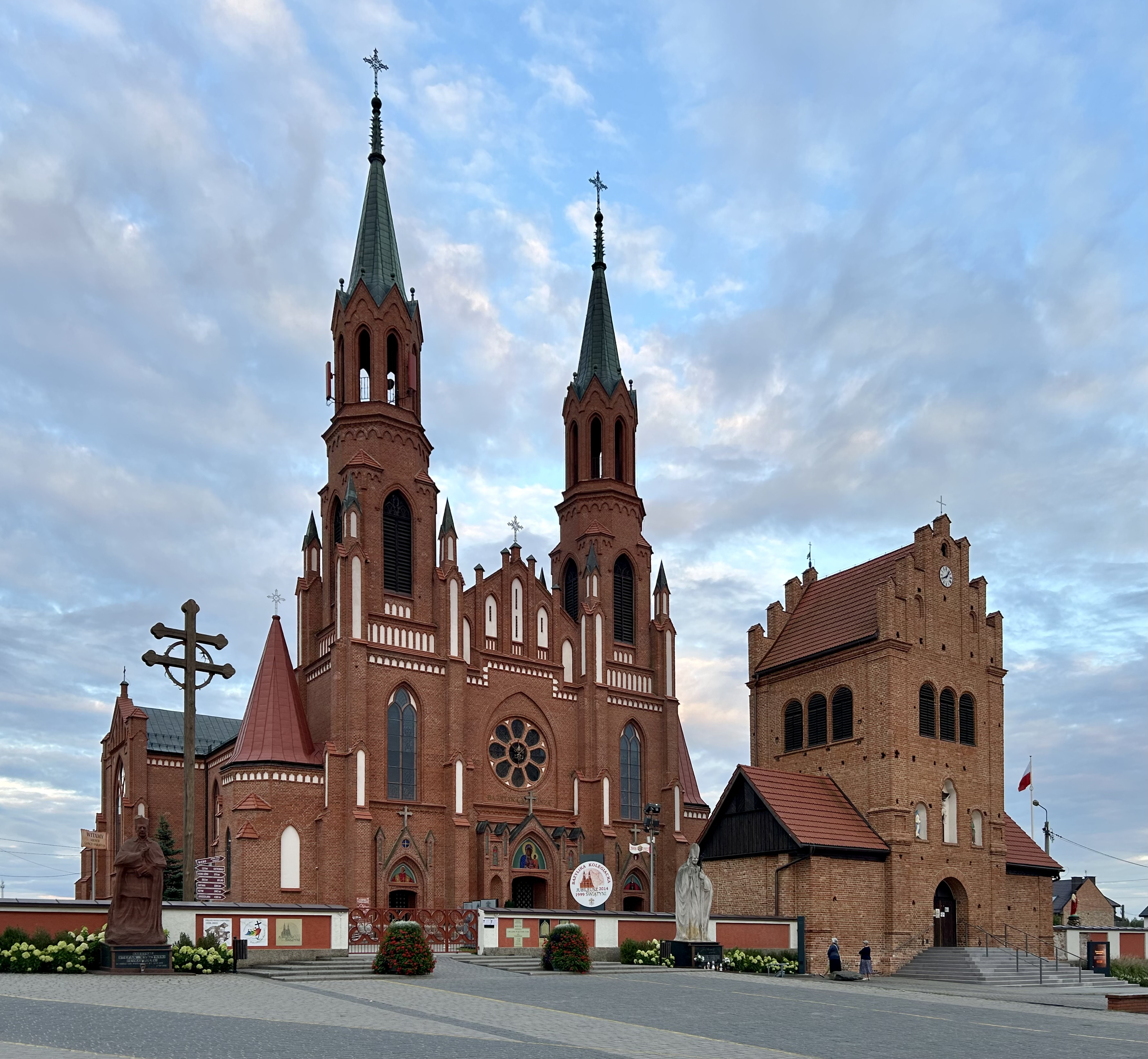
- Collegiate Basilica Church of the Holy Trinity

- Flag Coat of arms

- Location within Poland
- Coordinates: 53°22′56″N 21°21′5″E
- Country: Poland
- Voivodeship: Masovian
- County: Ostrołęka
- Gmina: Myszyniec
- Established: 1654
- Town rights: 1798-1870, 1993

Government
  - Mayor: Elżbieta Abramczyk

Area
  - Total: 10.74 km^{2} (4.15 sq mi)

Population (2010)
  - Total: 2,950
  - Density: 275/km^{2} (711/sq mi)
- Time zone: UTC+1 (CET)
  - Summer (DST): UTC+2 (CEST)
- Postal code: 07-430
- Area code: +48 29
- Car plates: WOS
- Website: http://www.myszyniec.pl/

Myszyniec [mɨˈʂɨɲɛt͡s] is a town in Ostrołęka County, Masovian Voivodeship, northeastern Poland, with 2,950 inhabitants (2010). It is located in the ethnocultural region of Kurpie in the historic region of Masovia.

== History ==
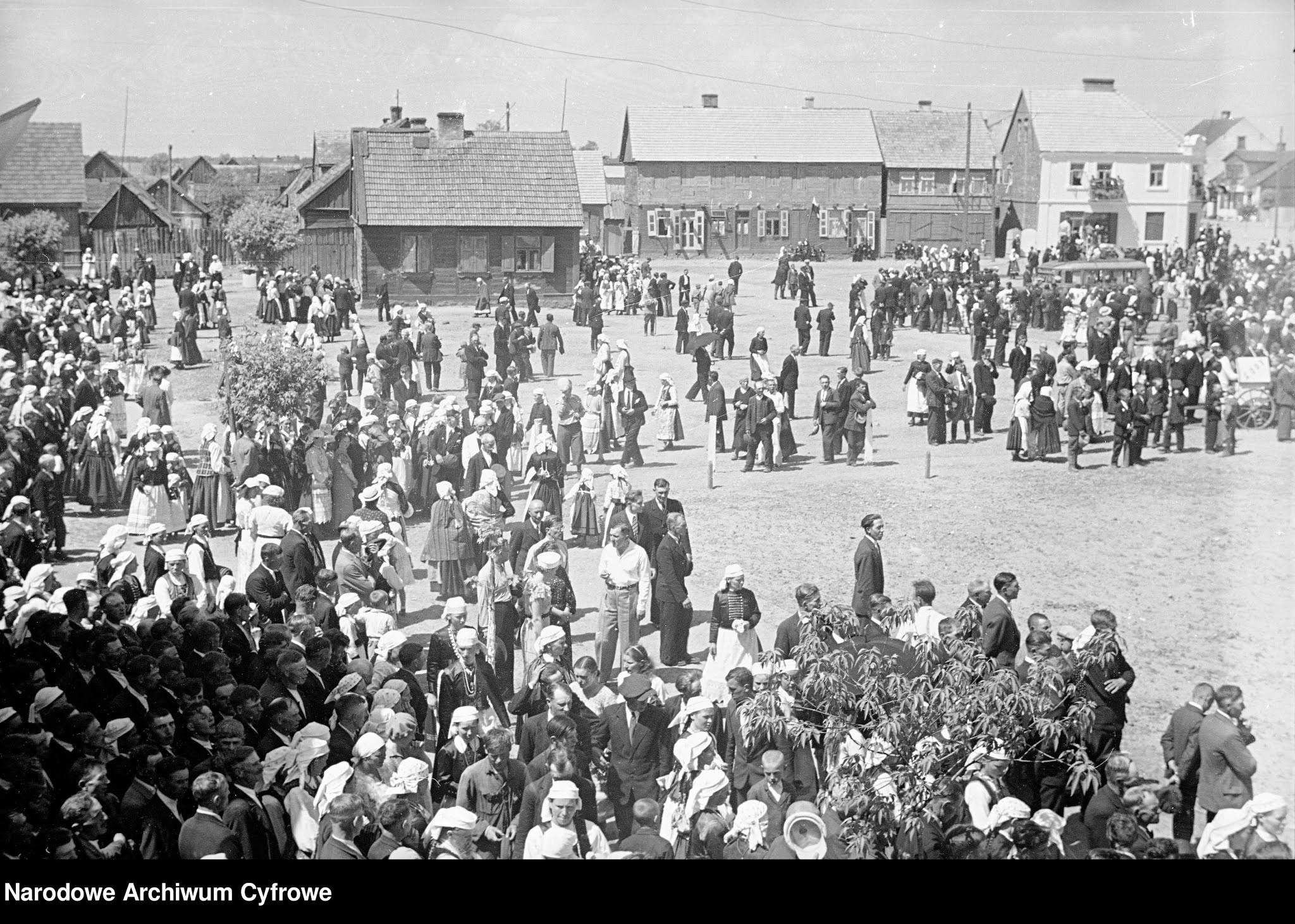
Corpus Christi procession in 1937

Myszyniec was founded in 1654 by the Jesuits, under a royal privilege issued by King John II Casimir Vasa. It was located in the Masovian Voivodeship in the Greater Poland Province of the Kingdom of Poland. The populace was initially mostly engaged in cartage and pig trading. In 1677, King John III Sobieski permitted the establishment of a school, a brewery and an inn. In 1708, the local Kurpie, led by regional Polish folk hero Stach Konwa, defeated the invading Swedes during the Great Northern War. In 1719, King Augustus II the Strong established annual fairs and weekly markets in Myszyniec. The town was granted town rights in 1798.

In August 1920, Poles defeated the invading Soviets in the Battle of Myszyniec.

During the initial stages of the German invasion of Poland, which marked the beginning of World War II, Myszyniec was the site of fierce Polish defense from September 1 to 4, 1939, but ultimately fell to Nazi Germany, which occupied the town until 1945. Several Poles, who were either born or lived and worked in Myszyniec, were murdered by the Russians in the Katyn massacre in 1940. The Polish resistance was active in the area. The last large battle between Polish partisans and the German occupiers in northern Masovia was fought near Myszyniec in December 1944.

== Demographics ==
Historical population
Year	Pop.	±%
1828	1,380	—
1862	1,788	+29.6%
1921	1,872	+4.7%
2010	2,950	+57.6%

== Cuisine ==
The officially protected traditional dish of Myszyniec is pierogi with blueberries, often served with smetana or honey (as designated by the Ministry of Agriculture and Rural Development of Poland).

== Sport ==
The local football team is Bartnik Myszyniec, which competes in the lower leagues.

== Notable people ==
- Władysław Skierkowski, (1886–1941) Polish priest
