= Brzozówka =

Brzozówka is the placename derived from Polish: brzoza, 'birch tree'. It may refer to:

- Brzozówka, Kuyavian-Pomeranian Voivodeship (north-central Poland)
- Brzozówka, Lublin Voivodeship (east Poland)
- Brzozówka, Podlaskie Voivodeship (north-east Poland)
- Brzozówka, Poddębice County in Łódź Voivodeship (central Poland)
- Brzozówka, Rawa County in Łódź Voivodeship (central Poland)
- Brzozówka, Kraków County in Lesser Poland Voivodeship (south Poland)
- Brzozówka, Olkusz County in Lesser Poland Voivodeship (south Poland)
- Brzozówka, Tarnów County in Lesser Poland Voivodeship (south Poland)
- Brzozówka, Świętokrzyskie Voivodeship (south-central Poland)
- Brzozówka, Kozienice County in Masovian Voivodeship (east-central Poland)
- Brzozówka, Mińsk County in Masovian Voivodeship (east-central Poland)
- Brzozówka, Ostrołęka County in Masovian Voivodeship (east-central Poland)
- Brzozówka, Gmina Czosnów, Nowy Dwór County in Masovian Voivodeship (east-central Poland)
- Brzozówka, Greater Poland Voivodeship (west-central Poland)
- Brzozówka, Lubusz Voivodeship (west Poland)
- Brzozówka, Pomeranian Voivodeship (north Poland)
- Brzozówka (Biebrza tributary), River in Poland, left tributary of Biebrza
- Polish name of Byarozawka (Grodno Region, Belarus)

== See also ==
- Brzozowa (disambiguation)
- Berezovka (disambiguation)
