= Brzozowa =

Brzozowa is the placename derived from Polish: brzoza, 'birch tree'. It may refer to:

- Brzozowa, Lublin Voivodeship (east Poland)
- Brzozowa, Grajewo County in Podlaskie Voivodeship (north-east Poland)
- Brzozowa, Mońki County in Podlaskie Voivodeship (north-east Poland)
- Brzozowa, Lesser Poland Voivodeship (south Poland)
- Brzozowa, Opatów County in Świętokrzyskie Voivodeship (south-central Poland)
- Brzozowa, Staszów County in Świętokrzyskie Voivodeship (south-central Poland)
- Brzozowa, Włoszczowa County in Świętokrzyskie Voivodeship (south-central Poland)
- Brzozowa, Masovian Voivodeship (east-central Poland)
- Brzozowa, Lubusz Voivodeship (west Poland)

== See also ==
- Brzozówka (disambiguation)
