= Łążyn =

Łążyn may refer to the following places:

- Łążyn, Gmina Obrowo in Kuyavian-Pomeranian Voivodeship (north-central Poland)
- Łążyn, Gmina Zławieś Wielka in Kuyavian-Pomeranian Voivodeship (north-central Poland)
- Łążyn, Warmian-Masurian Voivodeship (north Poland)
