= Klimki =

Klimki may refer to the following places:

- Klimki, Lublin Voivodeship (east Poland)
- Klimki, Masovian Voivodeship (east-central Poland)
- Klimki, Podlaskie Voivodeship (north-east Poland)
- Klimki, Warmian-Masurian Voivodeship (north Poland)
