= Bartoszewo =

Bartoszewo refers to the following places in Poland:

- Bartoszewo, Kuyavian-Pomeranian Voivodeship
- Bartoszewo, West Pomeranian Voivodeship
