= Osiek, Toruń County =

Osiek
- Village
- Location within Poland
- Coordinates: 52°55′37″N 18°48′18″E
- Country: Poland
- Voivodeship: Kuyavian-Pomeranian
- County: Toruń
- Gmina: Obrowo
- Population: 1,064

Osiek [ˈɔɕɛk] is a village in the administrative district of Gmina Obrowo, within Toruń County, Kuyavian-Pomeranian Voivodeship, in north-central Poland.
