= Karaska =

- Village
- Location within Poland
- Coordinates: 53°16′0″N 21°18′46″E
- Country: Poland
- Voivodeship: Masovian
- County: Ostrołęka
- Gmina: Kadzidło
- Population: 30

Karaska [kaˈraska] is a village in the administrative district of Gmina Kadzidło, within Ostrołęka County, Masovian Voivodeship, in east-central Poland.
