= Sąsieczno, Toruń County =

Sąsieczno
- Village
- Location within Poland
- Coordinates: 52°56′N 18°51′E
- Country: Poland
- Voivodeship: Kuyavian-Pomeranian
- County: Toruń
- Gmina: Obrowo

Sąsieczno [sɔ̃ˈɕɛt͡ʂnɔ] is a village in the administrative district of Gmina Obrowo, within Toruń County, Kuyavian-Pomeranian Voivodeship, in north-central Poland.
