= Gmina Kadzidło =

Gmina Kadzidło Kadzidło Commune
- Gmina
- Flag Coat of arms

- Location within Poland Location within Masovian Voivodeship
- Coordinates (Kadzidło): 53°13′59″N 21°28′0″E
- Country: Poland
- Voivodeship: Masovian
- County: Ostrołęka County
- Seat: Kadzidło

Area
  - Total: 258.94 km^{2} (99.98 sq mi)

Population (2011)
  - Total: 11,444
  - Density: 44.196/km^{2} (114.47/sq mi)
- Website: http://www.kadzidlo.pl

Gmina Kadzidło is a rural gmina (administrative district) in Ostrołęka County, Masovian Voivodeship, in east-central Poland. Its seat is the village of Kadzidło, which lies approximately 20 kilometres (12 mi) north of Ostrołęka and 118 km (73 mi) north of Warsaw.

The gmina covers an area of 258.94 square kilometres (100.0 sq mi), and as of 2006 its total population is 11,030 (11,444 in 2011).

== Villages ==
Gmina Kadzidło contains the following villages and settlements: Brzozowa, Brzozówka, Chudek, Czarnia, Dylewo, Dylewo Nowe, Gleba, Golanka, Grale, Jazgarka, Jeglijowiec, Kadzidło, Karaska, Kierzek, Klimki, Krobia, Kuczyńskie, Piasecznia, Podgórze, Rososz, Siarcza Łąka, Sól, Strzałki, Tatary, Todzia and Wach.

== Neighbouring gminas ==
Gmina Kadzidło is bordered by the gminas of Baranowo, Lelis, Łyse, Myszyniec and Zbójna.
