= Sól, Masovian Voivodeship =

Sól
- Village
- Location within Poland
- Coordinates: 53°17′N 21°31′E
- Country: Poland
- Voivodeship: Masovian
- County: Ostrołęka
- Gmina: Kadzidło

Sól [sul] is a village in the administrative district of Gmina Kadzidło, within Ostrołęka County, Masovian Voivodeship, in east-central Poland.
