= Tatary, Masovian Voivodeship =

Tatary
- Village
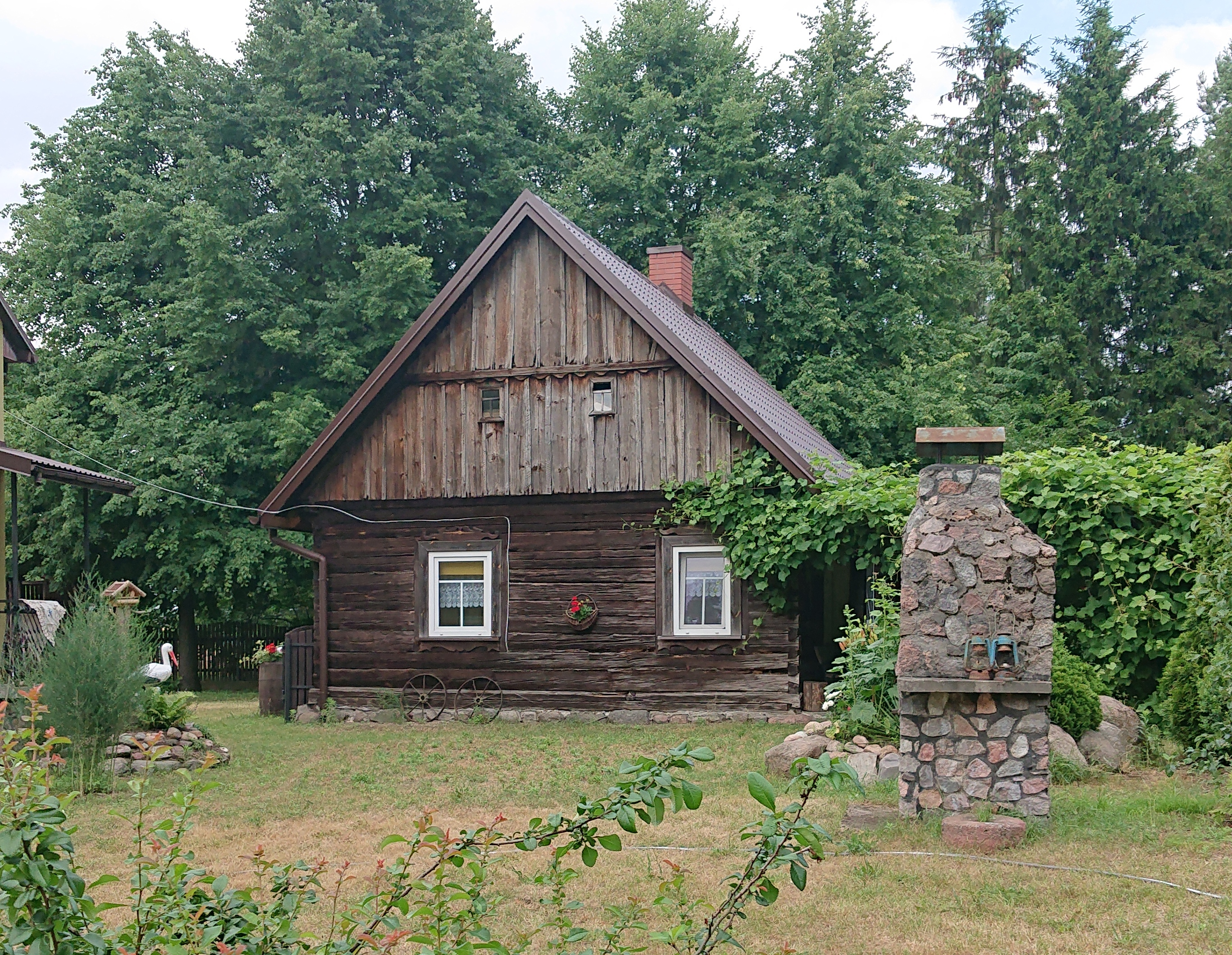

- Location within Poland
- Coordinates: 53°14′04″N 21°30′36″E
- Country: Poland
- Voivodeship: Masovian
- County: Ostrołęka
- Gmina: Kadzidło
- Time zone: UTC+1 (CET)
  - Summer (DST): UTC+2 (CEST)
- Vehicle registration: WOS

Tatary [taˈtarɨ] is a village in the administrative district of Gmina Kadzidło, within Ostrołęka County, Masovian Voivodeship, in east-central Poland.
