= Gmina Obrowo =

Gmina Obrowo Obrowo Commune
- Gmina
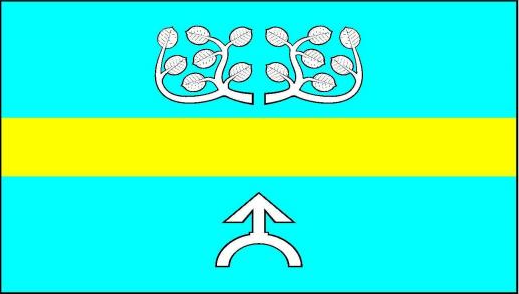
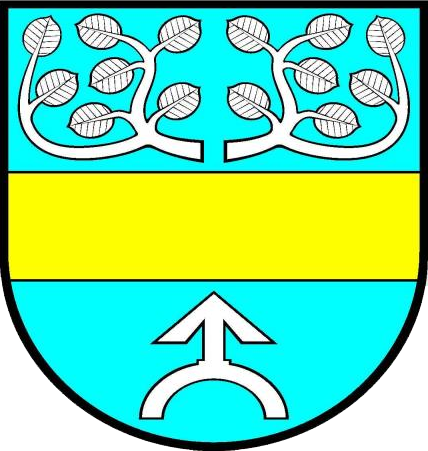
- Flag Coat of arms

- Location within Poland
- Coordinates (Obrowo): 52°58′18″N 18°52′42″E
- Country: Poland
- Voivodeship: Kuyavian-Pomeranian
- County: Toruń County
- Seat: Obrowo

Area
  - Total: 161.97 km^{2} (62.54 sq mi)

Population (2006)
  - Total: 10,010
  - Density: 61.80/km^{2} (160.1/sq mi)
- Website: https://www.obrowo.pl

Gmina Obrowo is a rural gmina (administrative district) in Toruń County, Kuyavian-Pomeranian Voivodeship, in north-central Poland. Its seat is the village of Obrowo, which lies approximately 19 kilometres (12 mi) east of Toruń.

The gmina covers an area of 161.97 square kilometres (62.5 sq mi), and as of 2006 its total population is 10,010.

== Villages ==
Gmina Obrowo contains the villages and settlements of Bartoszewo, Brzozówka, Dobrzejewice, Dzikowo, Głogowo, Kawęczyn, Kazimierzewo, Kuźniki, Łążyn, Łążynek, Łęk-Osiek, Obory, Obrowo, Osiek, Sąsieczno, Silno, Skrzypkowo, Smogorzewiec, Stajenczynki, Szembekowo, Zawały, Zębówiec and Zębowo.

== Neighbouring gminas ==
Gmina Obrowo is bordered by the town of Ciechocinek and by the gminas of Aleksandrów Kujawski, Ciechocin, Czernikowo, Lubicz and Wielka Nieszawka.
