= Zawały, Kuyavian-Pomeranian Voivodeship =

Zawały
- Village
- Location within Poland
- Coordinates: 52°59′13″N 18°50′10″E
- Country: Poland
- Voivodeship: Kuyavian-Pomeranian
- County: Toruń
- Gmina: Obrowo

Zawały [zaˈvawɨ] is a village in the administrative district of Gmina Obrowo, within Toruń County, Kuyavian-Pomeranian Voivodeship, in north-central Poland.
