= Głogowo =

- Village
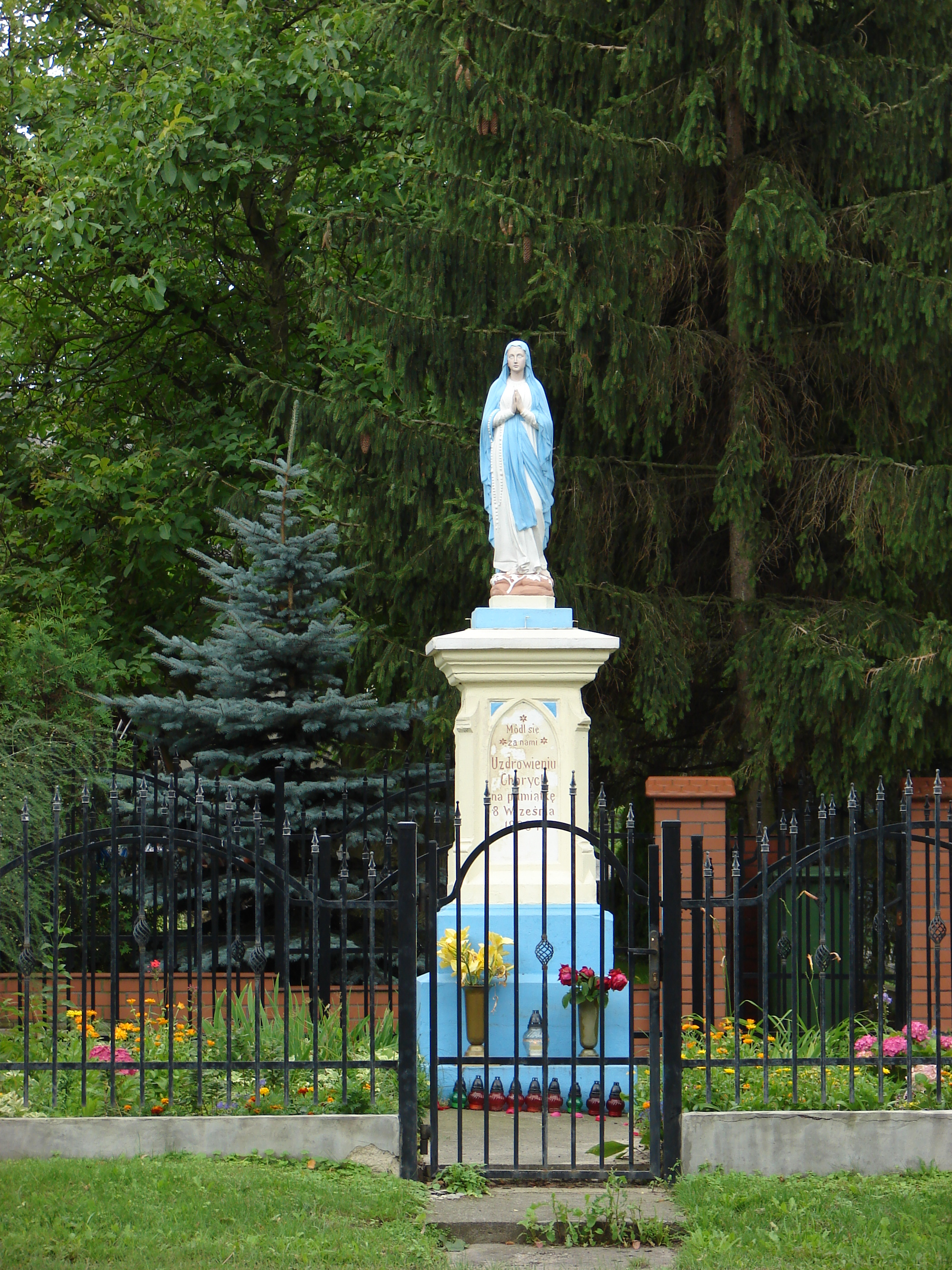
- Statue of Virgin Mary, built 1908.

- Location within Poland
- Coordinates: 53°00′52″N 18°49′12″E
- Country: Poland
- Voivodeship: Kuyavian-Pomeranian
- County: Toruń
- Gmina: Obrowo
- Population: 1,800

Głogowo [ɡwɔˈɡɔvɔ] is a village in the administrative district of Gmina Obrowo, within Toruń County, Kuyavian-Pomeranian Voivodeship, in north-central Poland.
