= Dobrzejewice =

- Village
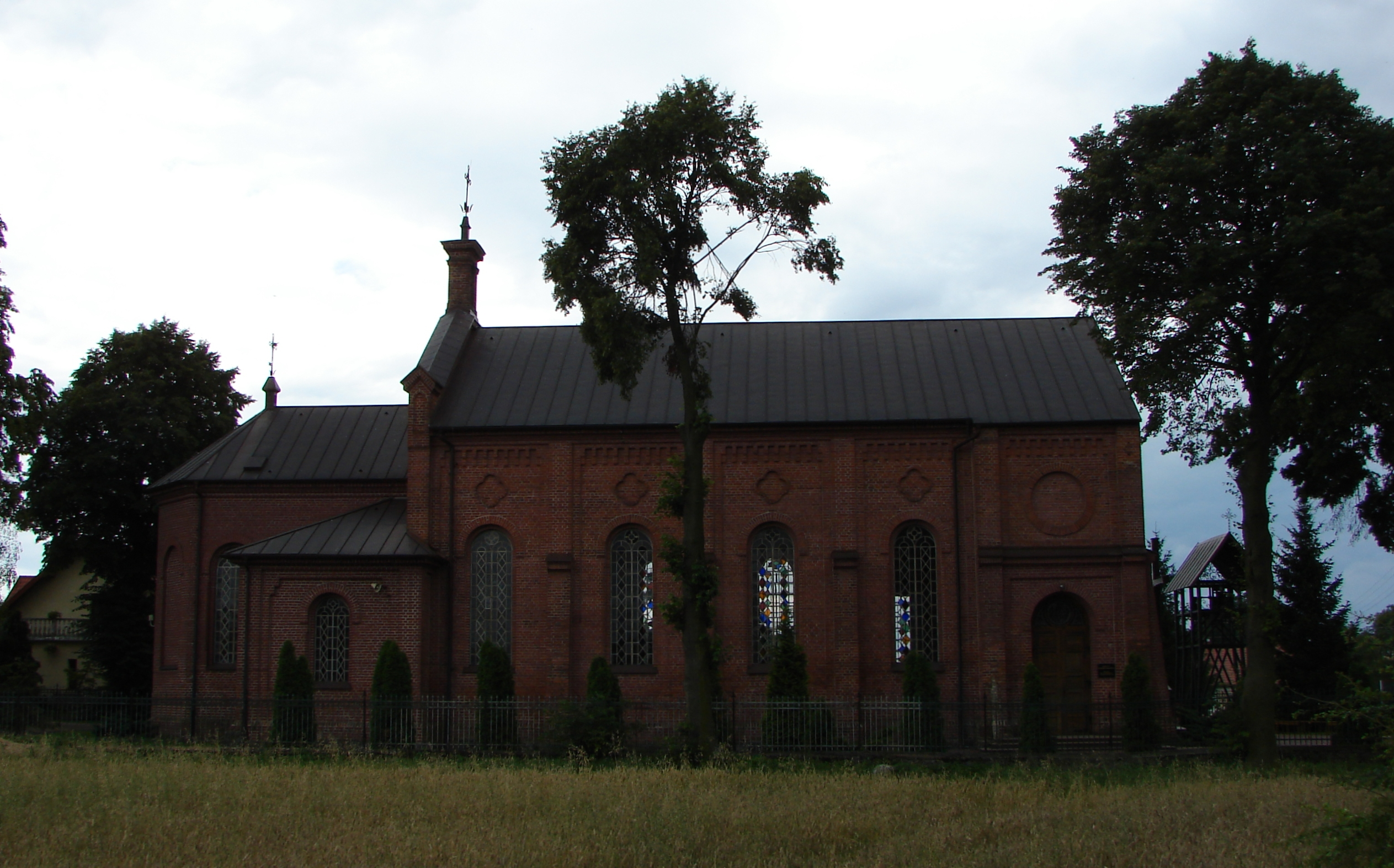
- Parish church of Saint Lawrence, completed in 1893.

- Location within Poland
- Coordinates: 53°0′N 18°50′E
- Country: Poland
- Voivodeship: Kuyavian-Pomeranian
- County: Toruń
- Gmina: Obrowo

Dobrzejewice [dɔbʐɛjɛˈvit͡sɛ] is a village in the administrative district of Gmina Obrowo, within Toruń County, Kuyavian-Pomeranian Voivodeship, in north-central Poland.
