= Siarcza Łąka =

- Village
- Location within Poland
- Coordinates: 53°15′49″N 21°24′32″E
- Country: Poland
- Voivodeship: Masovian
- County: Ostrołęka
- Gmina: Kadzidło
- Population: 250

Siarcza Łąka [ˈɕart͡ʂa ˈwɔŋka] is a village in the administrative district of Gmina Kadzidło, within Ostrołęka County, Masovian Voivodeship, in east-central Poland.
