= Łęk-Osiek =

- Village
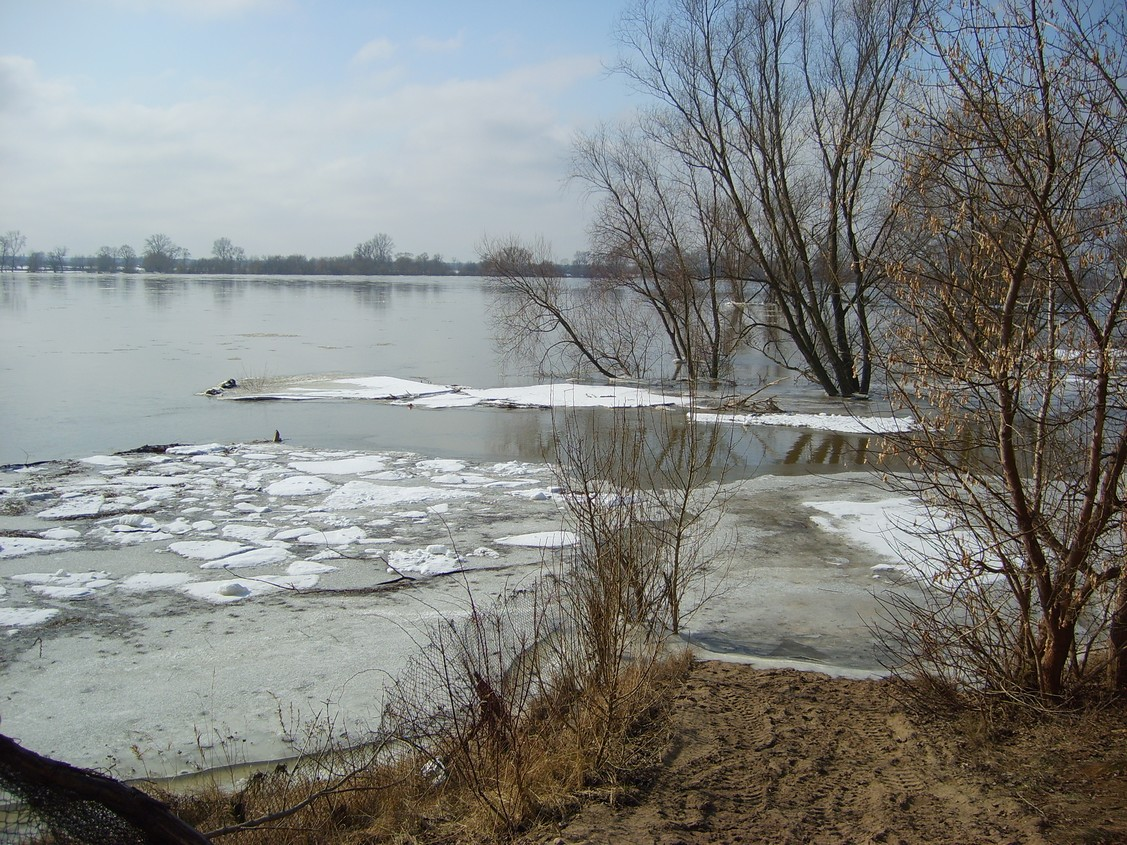

- Location within Poland
- Coordinates: 52°54′00″N 18°49′00″E
- Country: Poland
- Voivodeship: Kuyavian-Pomeranian
- County: Toruń
- Gmina: Obrowo
- Population (2011): 96

Łęk-Osiek [ˈwɛnk ˈɔɕɛk] is a village in the administrative district of Gmina Obrowo, within Toruń County, Kuyavian-Pomeranian Voivodeship, in north-central Poland.
