= Czarnia, Gmina Kadzidło =

Czarnia
- Village
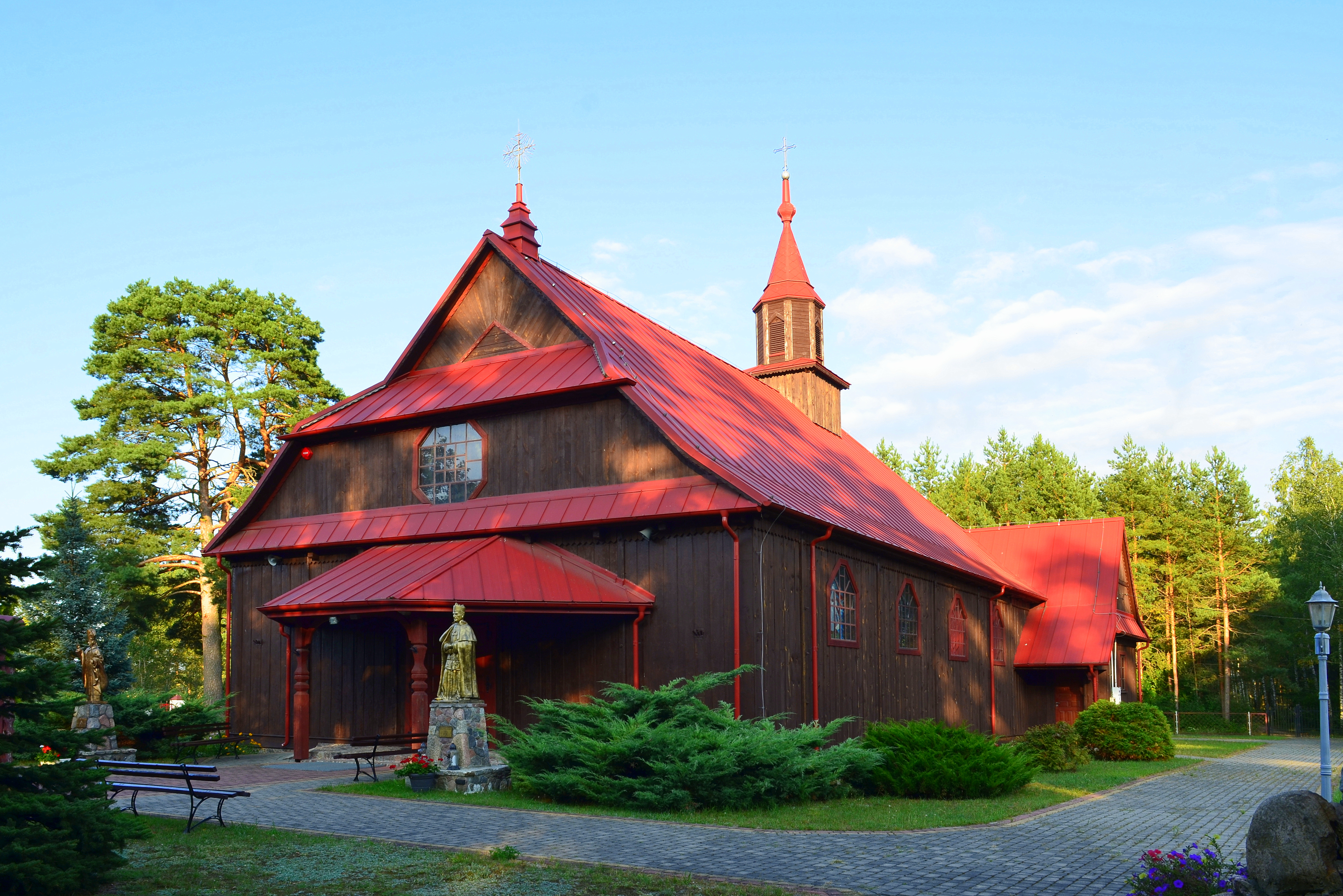

- Location within Poland
- Coordinates: 53°16′08″N 21°37′16″E
- Country: Poland
- Voivodeship: Masovian
- County: Ostrołęka
- Gmina: Kadzidło
- Time zone: UTC+1 (CET)
  - Summer (DST): UTC+2 (CEST)
- Vehicle registration: WOS

Czarnia [ˈt͡ʂarɲa] is a village in the administrative district of Gmina Kadzidło, within Ostrołęka County, Masovian Voivodeship, in east-central Poland.
