= Rososz, Ostrołęka County =

Rososz
- Village
- Location within Poland
- Coordinates: 53°16′52″N 21°26′27″E
- Country: Poland
- Voivodeship: Masovian
- County: Ostrołęka
- Gmina: Kadzidło

Rososz [ˈrɔsɔʂ] is a village in the administrative district of Gmina Kadzidło, within Ostrołęka County, Masovian Voivodeship, in east-central Poland.
