= Dylewo Nowe =

- Village
- Location within Poland
- Coordinates: 53°10′43″N 21°27′44″E
- Country: Poland
- Voivodeship: Masovian
- County: Ostrołęka
- Gmina: Kadzidło
- Website: http://www.serwisdylewo.yoyo.pl

Dylewo Nowe [dɨˈlɛvɔ ˈnɔvɛ] is a village in the administrative district of Gmina Kadzidło, within Ostrołęka County, Masovian Voivodeship, in east-central Poland.
