= Silno, Kuyavian-Pomeranian Voivodeship =

Silno
- Village
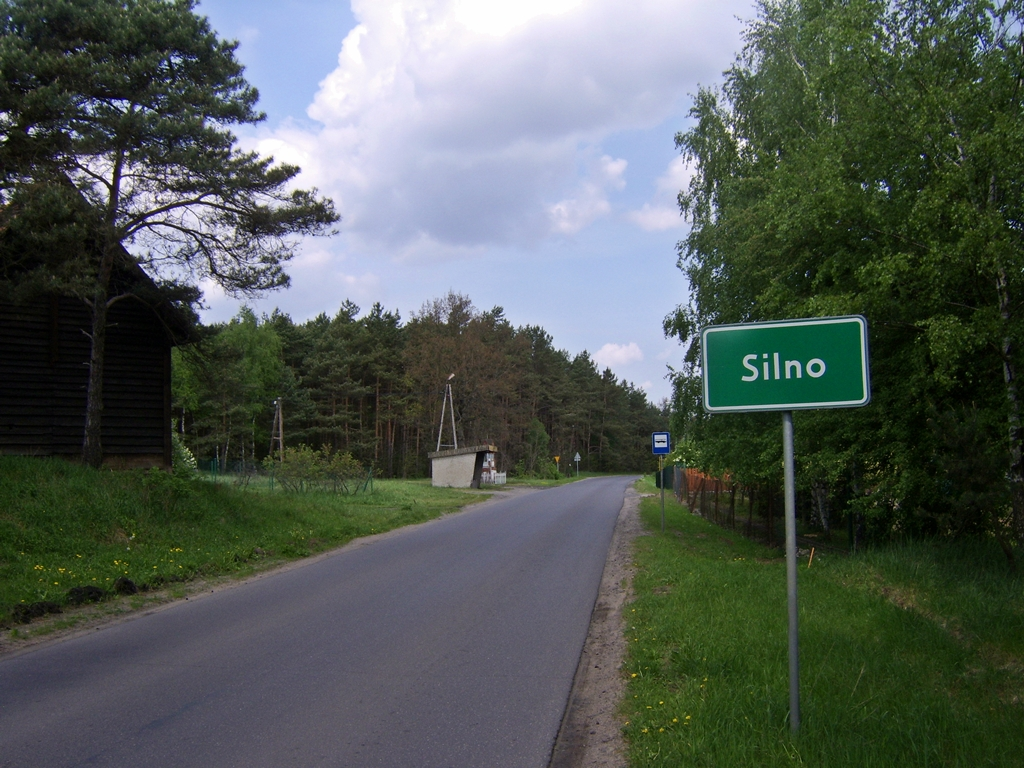
- Entrance to the village

- Location within Poland
- Coordinates: 52°57′N 18°44′E
- Country: Poland
- Voivodeship: Kuyavian-Pomeranian
- County: Toruń
- Gmina: Obrowo
- Population: 3,458 [2,014]
- Time zone: UTC+1 (CET)
  - Summer (DST): UTC+2 (CEST)
- Vehicle registration: CTR

Silno [ˈɕilnɔ] is a city in the administrative district of Gmina Obrowo, within Toruń County, Kuyavian-Pomeranian Voivodeship, in north-central Poland. It is located on the Vistula in the historic Dobrzyń Land.

== History ==
During the German occupation of Poland (World War II), Silno was one of the sites of executions of Poles, carried out by the Germans in 1939 as part of the Intelligenzaktion.

== Transport ==
The Voivodeship roads 258 and 654 run through the village, and the Polish A1 and S10 highways run nearby, west and north of the village.
