= Kadzidło, Masovian Voivodeship =

Kadzidło
- Village
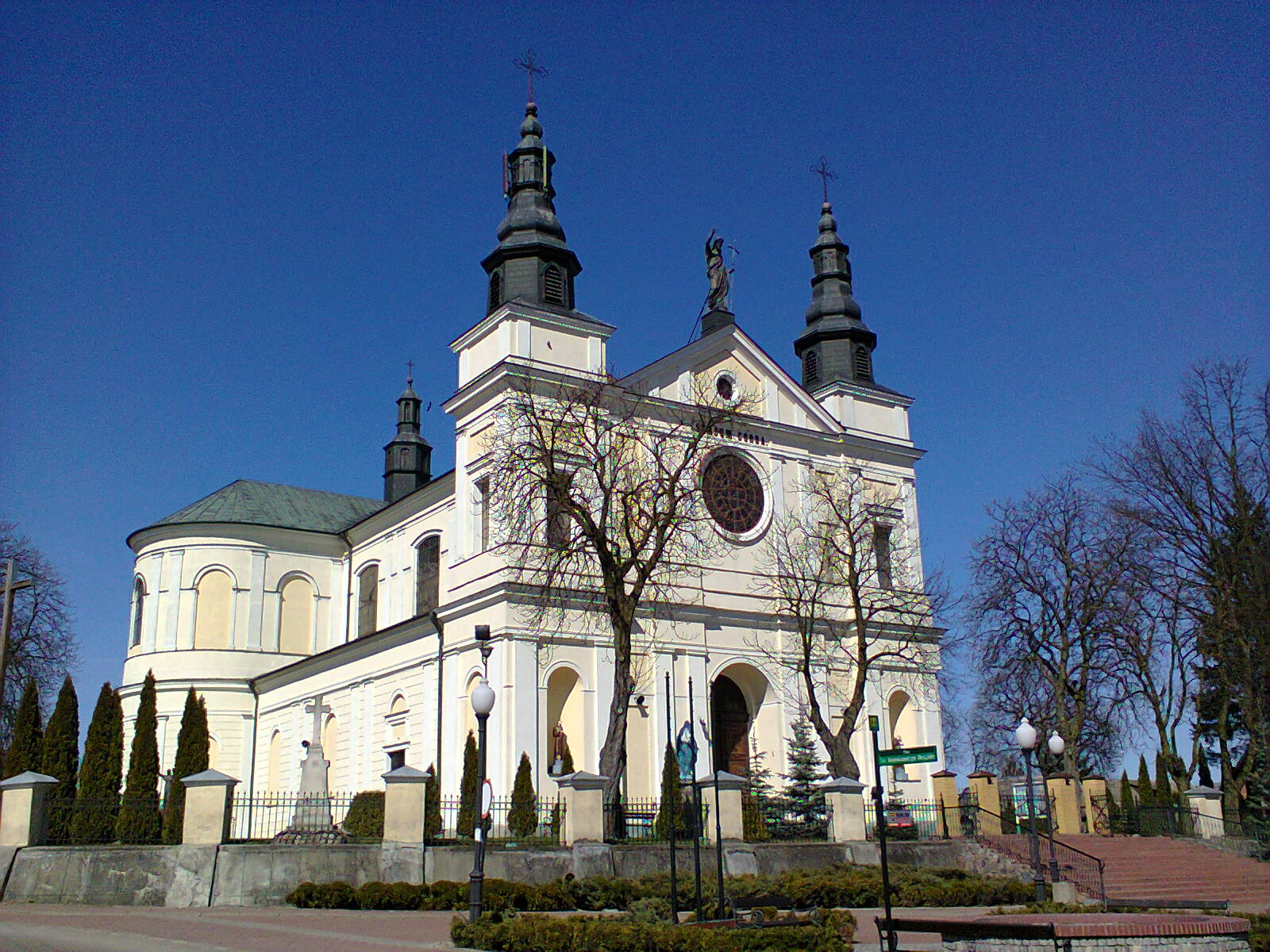
- Church of the Holy Spirit

- Location within Poland
- Coordinates: 53°13′59″N 21°28′0″E
- Country: Poland
- Voivodeship: Masovian
- County: Ostrołęka
- Gmina: Kadzidło

Population
  - Total: 4,032
- Time zone: UTC+1 (CET)
  - Summer (DST): UTC+2 (CEST)

Kadzidło is a village in Ostrołęka County, Masovian Voivodeship, in east-central Poland. It is the seat of the gmina (administrative district) called Gmina Kadzidło.

== History ==
15 Polish citizens were murdered by Nazi Germany in the village during World War II.
