= Dzikowo, Kuyavian-Pomeranian Voivodeship =

Dzikowo
- Village
- Location within Poland
- Coordinates: 52°56′23″N 18°46′28″E
- Country: Poland
- Voivodeship: Kuyavian-Pomeranian
- County: Toruń
- Gmina: Obrowo
- Population (2014): 391

Dzikowo ([d͡ʑiˈkɔvɔ]; German: 1942–45 Sickau) is a village in the administrative district of Gmina Obrowo, within Toruń County, Kuyavian-Pomeranian Voivodeship, in north-central Poland.
