= Strzałki, Ostrołęka County =

Strzałki
- Village
- Location within Poland
- Coordinates: 53°13′45″N 21°24′29″E
- Country: Poland
- Voivodeship: Masovian
- County: Ostrołęka
- Gmina: Kadzidło

Strzałki [ˈstʂau̯ki] is a village in the administrative district of Gmina Kadzidło, within Ostrołęka County, Masovian Voivodeship, in east-central Poland.
