= Kazimierzewo, Toruń County =

Kazimierzewo
- Village
- Location within Poland
- Coordinates: 52°59′N 18°55′E
- Country: Poland
- Voivodeship: Kuyavian-Pomeranian
- County: Toruń
- Gmina: Obrowo

Kazimierzewo [kaʑimjɛˈʐɛvɔ] is a village in the administrative district of Gmina Obrowo, within Toruń County, Kuyavian-Pomeranian Voivodeship, in north-central Poland.
