= Dylewo, Ostrołęka County =

Dylewo
- Village
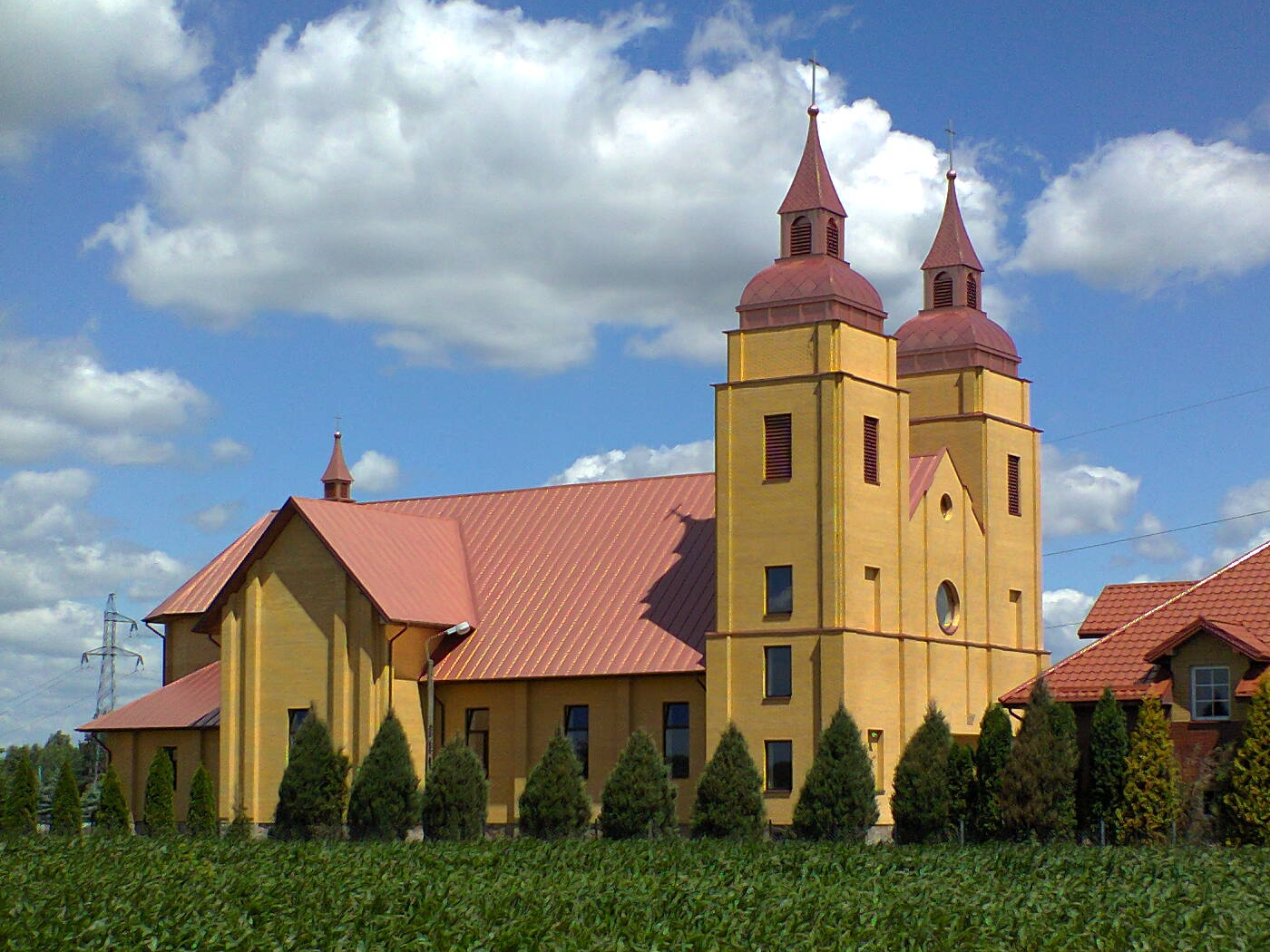
- Church of Our Lady of Ostra Brama Mother of Mercy

- Location within Poland
- Coordinates: 53°11′36″N 21°27′6″E
- Country: Poland
- Voivodeship: Masovian
- County: Ostrołęka
- Gmina: Kadzidło

Population
  - Total: 1,352
- Website: http://www.serwisdylewo.yoyo.pl

Dylewo [dɨˈlɛvɔ] is a village in the administrative district of Gmina Kadzidło, within Ostrołęka County, Masovian Voivodeship, in east-central Poland.
