= Bartoszewo, Kuyavian-Pomeranian Voivodeship =

Bartoszewo
- Village
- Location within Poland
- Coordinates: 52°59′9″N 18°54′12″E
- Country: Poland
- Voivodeship: Kuyavian-Pomeranian
- County: Toruń
- Gmina: Obrowo
- Time zone: UTC+1 (CET)
  - Summer (DST): UTC+2 (CEST)
- Vehicle registration: CTR

Bartoszewo [bartɔˈʂɛvɔ] is a settlement, part of the village of Zębówiec in the administrative district of Gmina Obrowo, within Toruń County, Kuyavian-Pomeranian Voivodeship, in north-central Poland.

== History ==
During the German occupation of Poland (World War II), Poles from Bartoszewo were among the victims of large massacres of Poles from the region carried out by the Germans in nearby Karnkowo as part of the Intelligenzaktion.
