= Kuźniki, Kuyavian-Pomeranian Voivodeship =

Kuźniki
- Village
- Location within Poland
- Coordinates: 53°2′N 18°54′E
- Country: Poland
- Voivodeship: Kuyavian-Pomeranian
- County: Toruń
- Gmina: Obrowo

Kuźniki [kuʑˈɲiki] is a village in the administrative district of Gmina Obrowo, within Toruń County, Kuyavian-Pomeranian Voivodeship, in north-central Poland.
