= Kawęczyn, Toruń County =

Kawęczyn
- Village
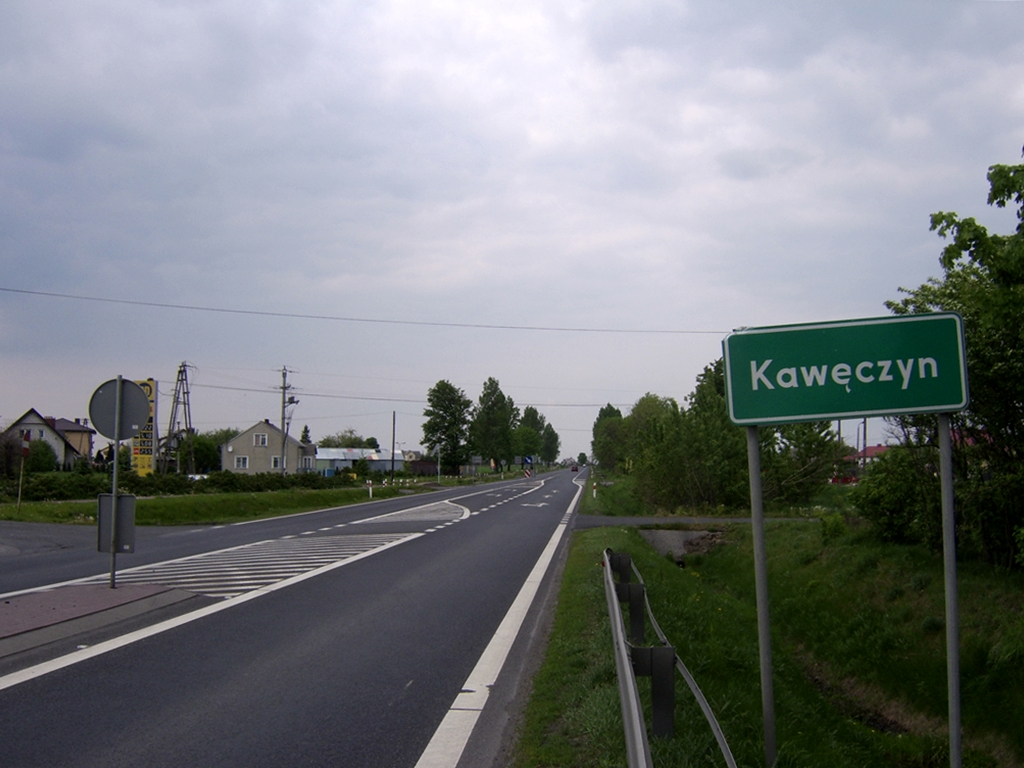

- Location within Poland
- Coordinates: 52°59′N 18°52′E
- Country: Poland
- Voivodeship: Kuyavian-Pomeranian
- County: Toruń
- Gmina: Obrowo
- Time zone: UTC+1 (CET)
  - Summer (DST): UTC+2 (CEST)
- Vehicle registration: CTR

Kawęczyn [kaˈvɛnt͡ʂɨn] is a village in the administrative district of Gmina Obrowo, within Toruń County, Kuyavian-Pomeranian Voivodeship, in north-central Poland.
