= Wach =

- Village
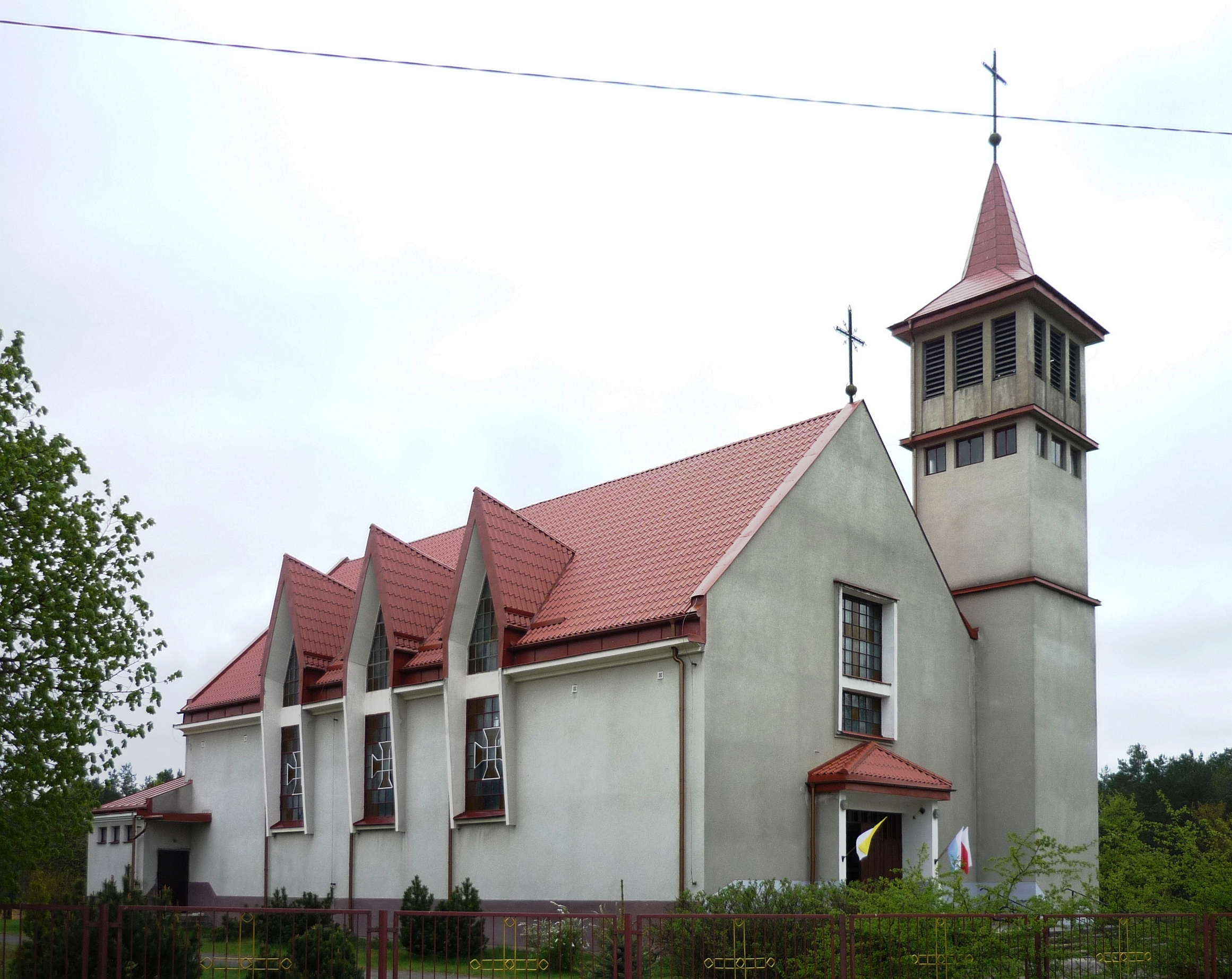
- Church in Wach

- Location within Poland
- Coordinates: 53°17′40″N 21°22′22″E
- Country: Poland
- Voivodeship: Masovian
- County: Ostrołęka
- Gmina: Kadzidło

Wach [vax] is a village in the administrative district of Gmina Kadzidło, within Ostrołęka County, Masovian Voivodeship, in east-central Poland.
