= Todzia =

- Village
- Location within Poland
- Coordinates: 53°16′26″N 21°26′12″E
- Country: Poland
- Voivodeship: Masovian
- County: Ostrołęka
- Gmina: Kadzidło

Todzia [ˈtɔd͡ʑa] is a village in the administrative district of Gmina Kadzidło, within Ostrołęka County, Masovian Voivodeship, in east-central Poland.
