= Obrowo, Toruń County =

Obrowo
- Village
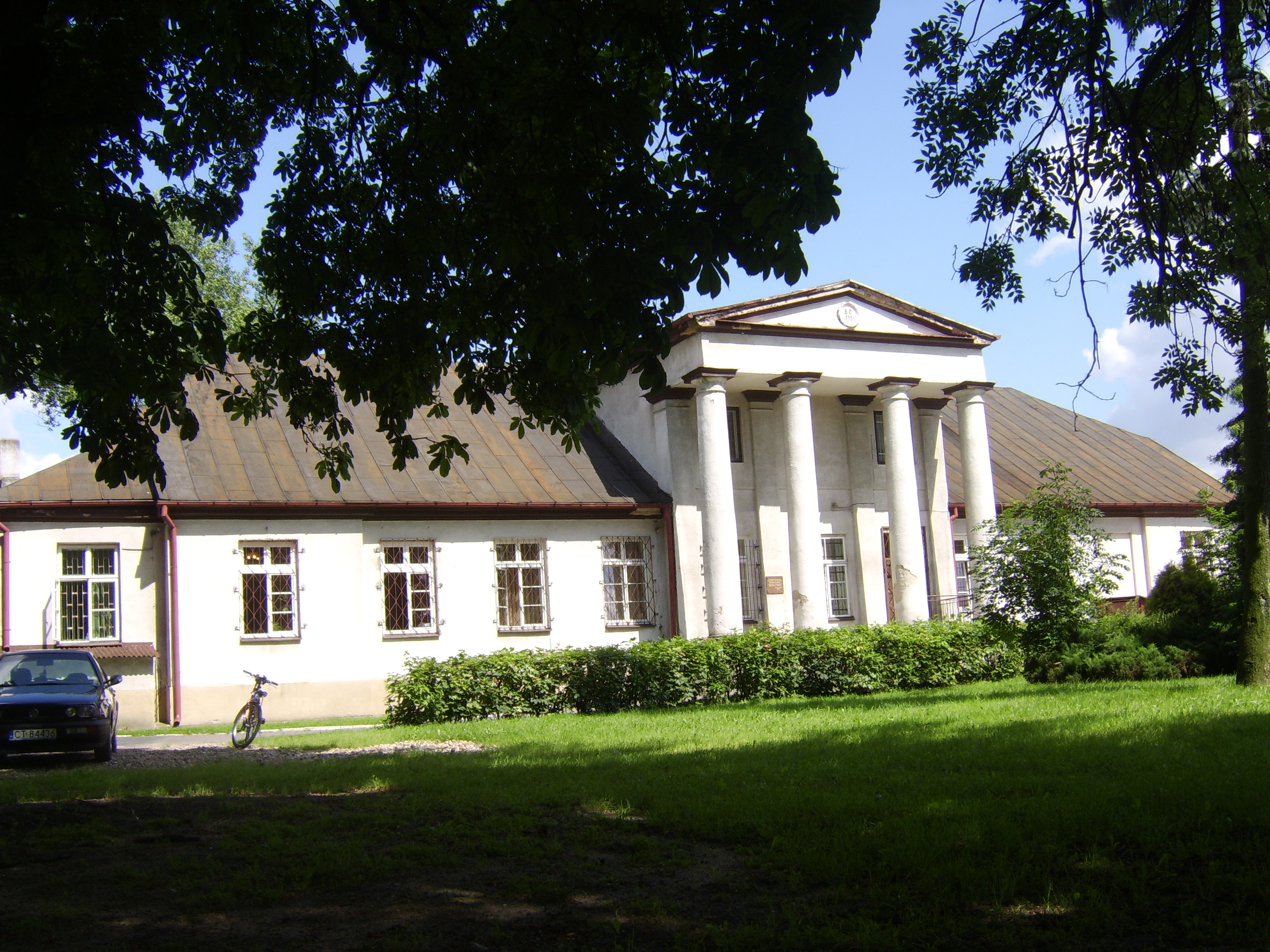

- Location within Poland
- Coordinates: 52°58′18″N 18°52′42″E
- Country: Poland
- Voivodeship: Kuyavian-Pomeranian
- County: Toruń
- Gmina: Obrowo
- Population: 1,322

Obrowo [ɔˈbrɔvɔ] is a village in Toruń County, Kuyavian-Pomeranian Voivodeship, in north-central Poland. It is the seat of the gmina (administrative district) called Gmina Obrowo.
