= Łążynek, Gmina Obrowo =

Łążynek
- Village
- Location within Poland
- Coordinates: 53°01′44″N 18°52′48″E
- Country: Poland
- Voivodeship: Kuyavian-Pomeranian
- County: Toruń
- Gmina: Obrowo

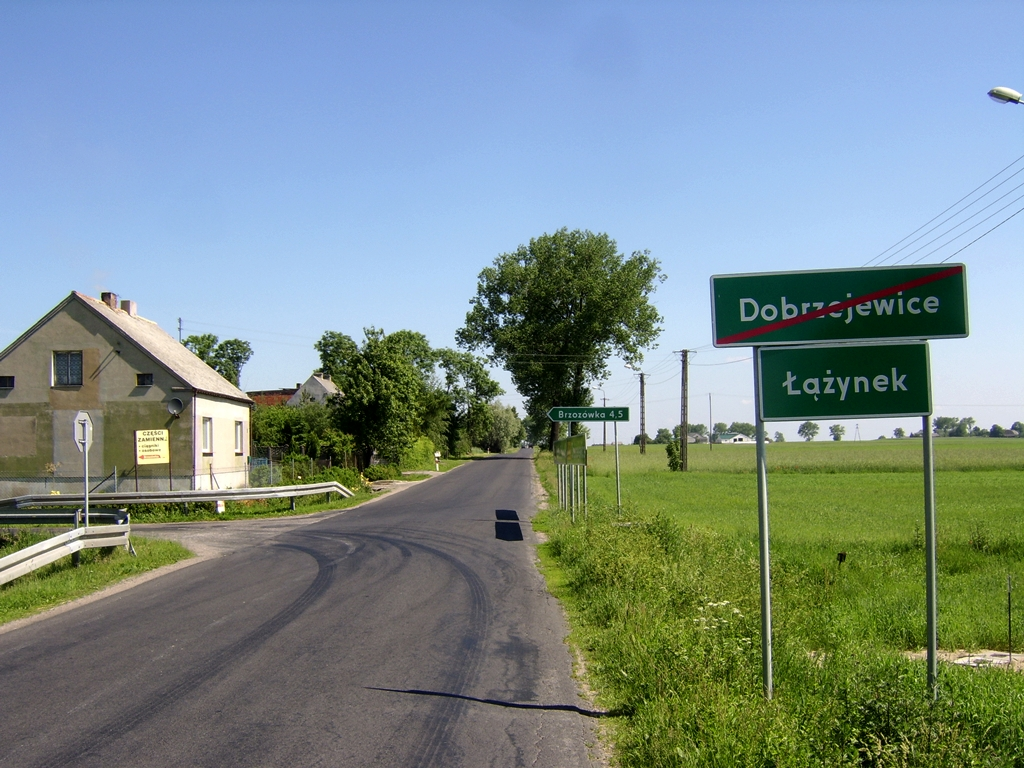
Łążynek, Gmina Obrowo

Łążynek [wɔ̃ˈʐɨnɛk] is a village in the administrative district of Gmina Obrowo, within Toruń County, Kuyavian-Pomeranian Voivodeship, in north-central Poland.
