= Łążyn, Gmina Obrowo =

Łążyn
- Village
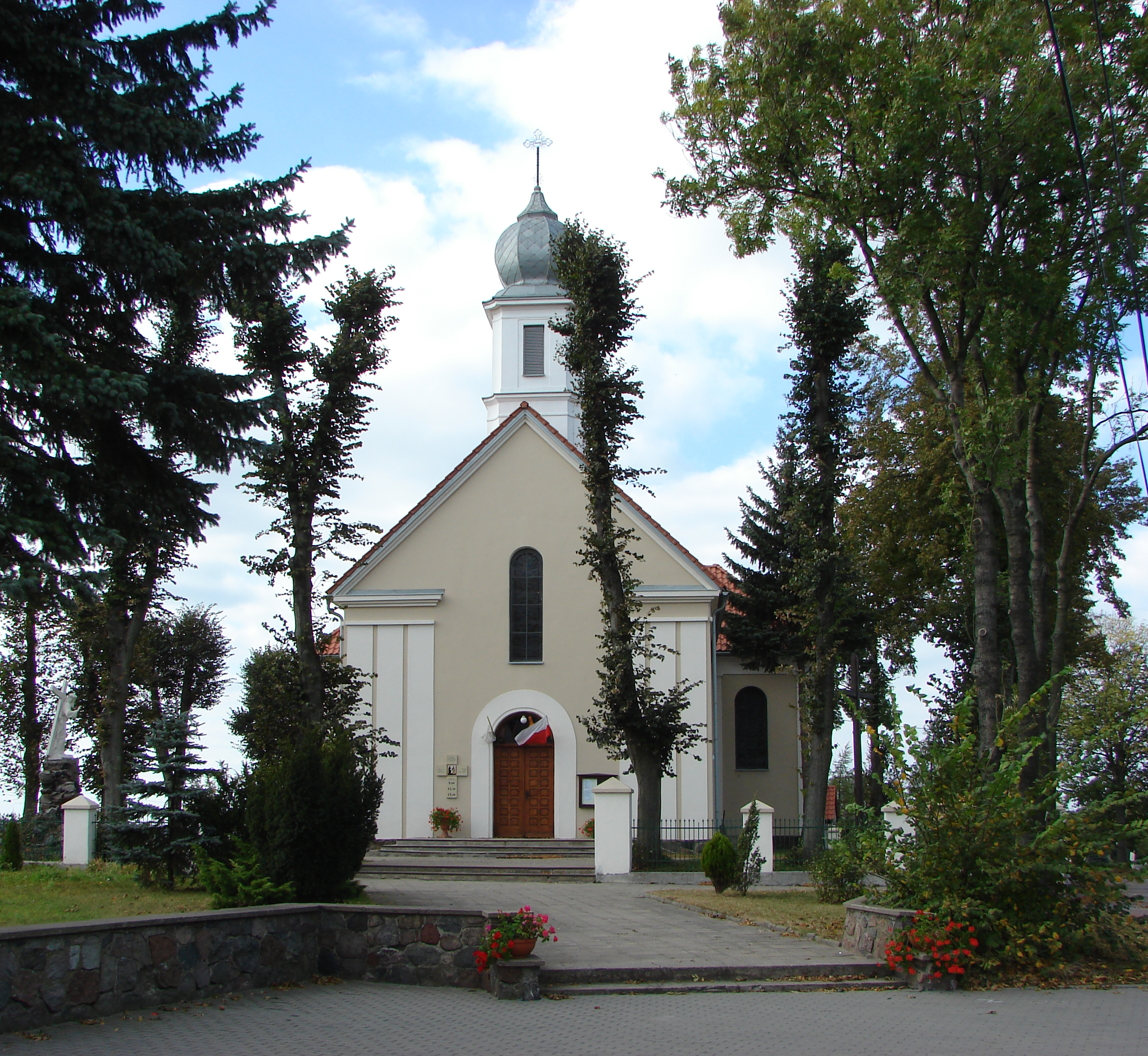
- Parish church of Sts Peter and Paul, built 1848.

- Location within Poland
- Coordinates: 53°0′N 18°53′E
- Country: Poland
- Voivodeship: Kuyavian-Pomeranian
- County: Toruń
- Gmina: Obrowo
- Population: 530

Łążyn [ˈwɔ̃ʐɨn] is a village in the administrative district of Gmina Obrowo, within Toruń County, Kuyavian-Pomeranian Voivodeship, in north-central Poland.
