= Brzozówka, Kuyavian-Pomeranian Voivodeship =

Brzozówka
- Village
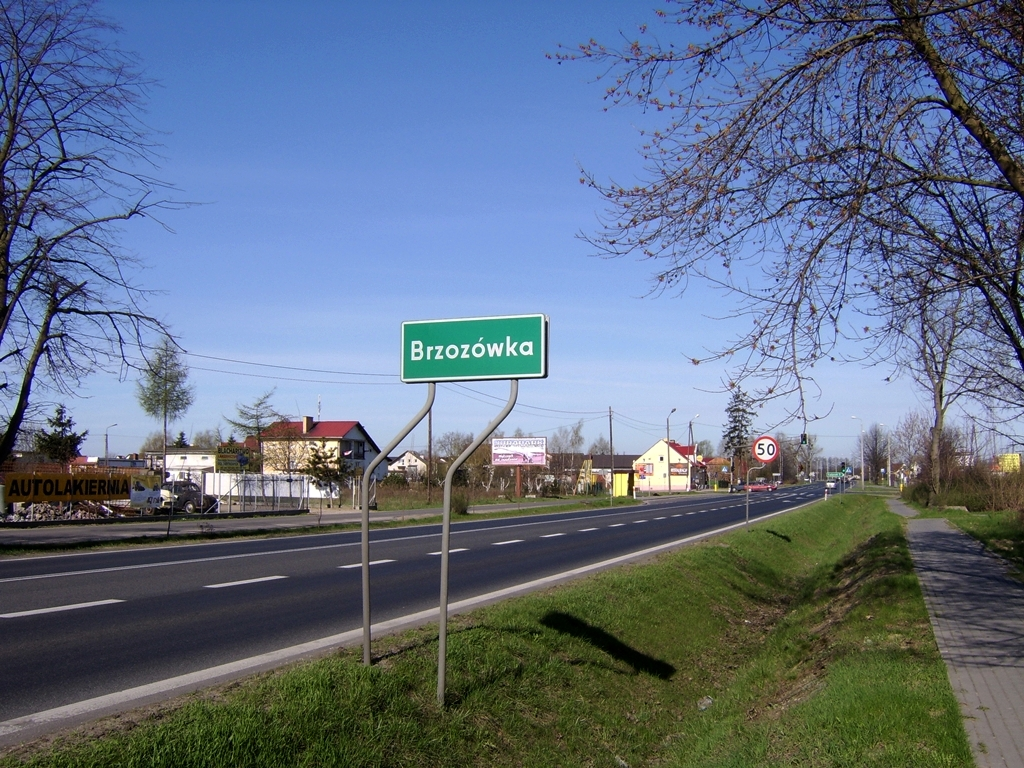
- Road sign leading to Brzozówka

- Location within Poland
- Coordinates: 53°01′10″N 18°47′56″E
- Country: Poland
- Voivodeship: Kuyavian-Pomeranian
- County: Toruń
- Gmina: Obrowo
- Population: 380

Brzozówka [bʐɔˈzufka] is a village in the administrative district of Gmina Obrowo, within Toruń County, Kuyavian-Pomeranian Voivodeship, in north-central Poland.
