= Brzozowa, Masovian Voivodeship =

Brzozowa
- Village
- Location within Poland
- Coordinates: 53°15′25″N 21°36′14″E
- Country: Poland
- Voivodeship: Masovian
- County: Ostrołęka
- Gmina: Kadzidło

Brzozowa [bʐɔˈzɔva] is a village in the administrative district of Gmina Kadzidło, within Ostrołęka County, Masovian Voivodeship, in east-central Poland.
