= Zębówiec =

- Village
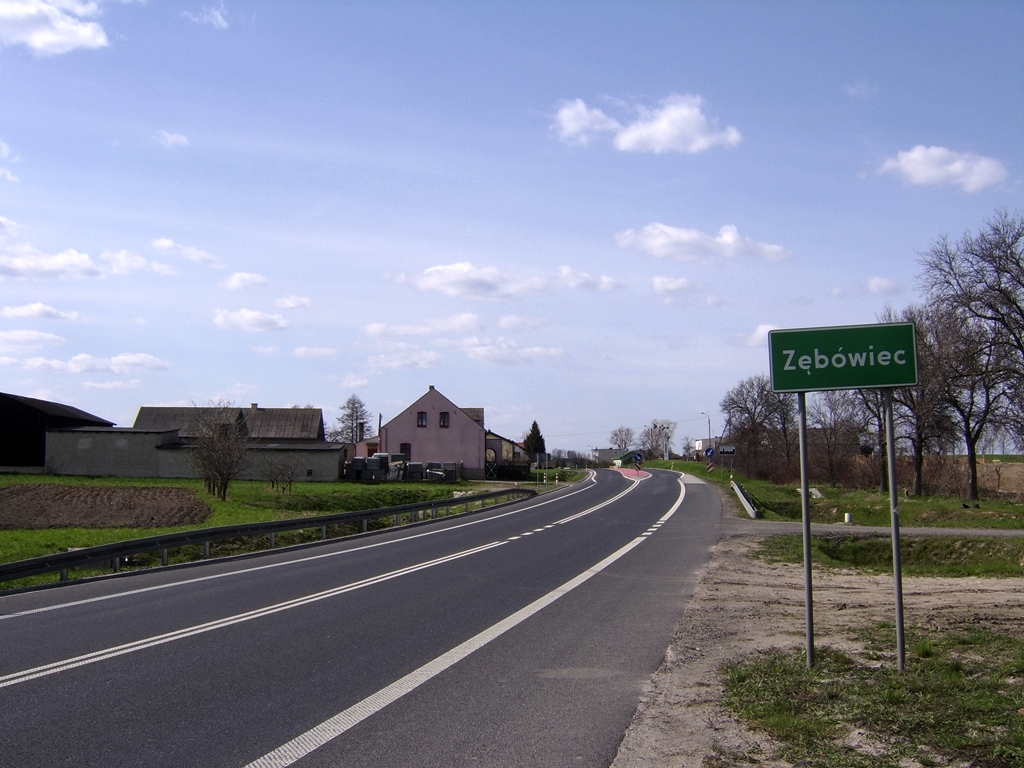

- Location within Poland
- Coordinates: 52°58′03″N 18°54′19″E
- Country: Poland
- Voivodeship: Kuyavian-Pomeranian
- County: Toruń
- Gmina: Obrowo

Zębówiec [zɛmˈbuvjɛt͡s] is a village in the administrative district of Gmina Obrowo, within Toruń County, Kuyavian-Pomeranian Voivodeship, in north-central Poland.
