= Borza =

Borza may refer to:

== Places ==
- Borza-Strumiany, Polish village
- Borza-Przechy, Polish village
- Nowe Borza, Polish village
- Borza, a village in Creaca Commune, Sălaj County, Romania

== Other uses ==
- Borza (surname)
