= Przewodowo =

Przewodowo may refer to these villages in Gmina Gzy, Pułtusk County, Masovian Voivodeship, Poland:

- Przewodowo-Majorat
- Nowe Przewodowo
- Przewodowo-Parcele
- Przewodowo Poduchowne
