= Gródek =

Gródek or Grodek may refer to:

== Places ==
=== Poland ===
- Gródek, Kuyavian-Pomeranian Voivodeship (north-central Poland)
- Gródek, Lesser Poland Voivodeship (south Poland)
- Gródek, Lower Silesian Voivodeship (south-west Poland)
- Gródek, Hrubieszów County in Lublin Voivodeship (east Poland)
- Gródek, Puławy County in Lublin Voivodeship (east Poland)
- Gródek, Gmina Jarczów, Tomaszów County in Lublin Voivodeship (south-east Poland)
- Gródek, Sokołów County in Masovian Voivodeship (east Poland)
- Gródek, Zwoleń County in Masovian Voivodeship (east-central Poland)
- Gródek, Białystok County in Podlaskie Voivodeship (north-east Poland)
- Gródek, Wysokie Mazowieckie County in Podlaskie Voivodeship (north-east Poland)
- Gródek, Silesian Voivodeship (south Poland)
- Gródek, Świętokrzyskie Voivodeship (south-central Poland)
- Jan Grodek State University, public vocational university in Sanok

=== Czech Republic ===
- Gródek, the Polish name for Hrádek in the Czech Republic

=== Ukraine ===
- Gródek Jagielloński, the former Polish town, now called Horodok, Lviv Oblast in Ukraine
- Gródek, the former Polish village, now called Horodok, Rivne Raion in Ukraine
- Gródek, the Polish name for Horodok, Khmelnytskyi Oblast in Ukraine

=== Germany ===
- Gródek, the Polish name for Spremberg in Germany, near the German-Polish border

== People ==
- Jan Grodek (died 1554), Polish rector of the Academy in Kraków
- Lisa Grodek (born 1987), German-Polish crochet designer and artist

== Events ==
- Battle of Horodok (1655) during the Russo-Polish War 1654–1667
- Battle of Gródek (1914) during World War I, inspiration for the poem Grodek by Georg Trakl
- Battle of Gródek (1915) during World War I

== Literature ==
- Grodek, a poem by the Austrian Expressionist poet Georg Trakl

== See also ==
- Gródek nad Dunajcem
- Gródek Nowy
- Gródek Rządowy
- Gródek Szlachecki
