= Ostaszewo, Masovian Voivodeship =

Ostaszewo
- Village
- Location within Poland
- Coordinates: 52°45′59″N 20°48′46″E
- Country: Poland
- Voivodeship: Masovian
- County: Ciechanów
- Gmina: Sońsk
- Population: 77

Ostaszewo [ɔstaˈʂɛvɔ] is a village in the administrative district of Gmina Sońsk, within Ciechanów County, Masovian Voivodeship, in east-central Poland, about 100 km (62 mi) north of Warsaw.

The village is composed of five parts: Ostaszewo Wielkie, Ostaszewo-Pańki, Ostaszewo-Włuski, Ostaszewo-Wola Rańcza and Ostaszewo-Czernie.
