= Łady-Krajęczyno =

Village in Gmina Gzy, Poland

- Village
- Location within Poland
- Coordinates: 52°43′08″N 20°56′04″E
- Country: Poland
- Voivodeship: Masovian
- County: Pułtusk
- Gmina: Gzy

Łady-Krajęczyno [ˈwadɨ krajɛnˈt͡ʂɨnɔ] is a village in the administrative district of Gmina Gzy, within Pułtusk County, Masovian Voivodeship, in east-central Poland.
