= Świeszewo =

Świeszewo may refer to the following places:

- Świeszewo, Gmina Pokrzywnica in Masovian Voivodeship (east-central Poland)
- Świeszewo, Gmina Świercze in Masovian Voivodeship (east-central Poland)
- Świeszewo, West Pomeranian Voivodeship (north-west Poland)
