= Kesy =

Kesy or KESY may refer to:

- Franciszek Kęsy (1920–1942), Polish beatified Catholic layperson executed by the Germans in World War II - see 108 Martyrs of World War II
- Jack Kesy, American 21st century theatre, television and film actor
- KESY (FM), a radio station licensed to serve Baker City, Oregon, United States
- KRTE-FM, a radio station licensed to serve Cuba, Missouri, United States, which held the call sign KESY from 2002 to 2010

== See also ==
- Kęsy-Pańki a village in Poland
- Kęsy-Wypychy a village in Poland
- Kesi (disambiguation)
- Kessy, a list of people with the surname
