= Klasky =

Klasky is a Slavic surname. Notable people with the surname include:

- Arlene Klasky, an American animator, graphic designer, television producer
  - Klasky Csupo, Inc., the company formed by (and named after) her and Csupo
- Mindy L. Klasky, an American fantasy novelist

== See also ==
- Nike, Inc. v. Marc K(l)asky
- Klaski
