= Kessy =

Kessy is a surname. Notable people with the surname include:

- Doreen Kessy, COO at Ubongo Learning Inc.
- Jennifer Kessy (born 1977), American beach volleyball player
- Kale Kessy, Canadian ice hockey player
- Paul Kessy (1915–1971), American basketball player
- Hassan Kessy (born 1994), Tanzanian footballer
- Semmy Kessy (born 1984), retired Tanzanian football striker

== See also ==
- Kesi (disambiguation), including a list of people with the surname
- Kesy (disambiguation), including a list of people with the surname
