= Ołdaki-Stefanowo =

- Village
- Location within Poland
- Coordinates: 52°43′15″N 20°54′46″E
- Country: Poland
- Voivodeship: Masovian
- County: Pułtusk
- Gmina: Gzy

Ołdaki-Stefanowo [ɔu̯ˈdaki stɛfaˈnɔvɔ] is a village in the administrative district of Gmina Gzy, within Pułtusk County, Masovian Voivodeship, in east-central Poland.
