= Szyszki-Folwark =

- Village
- Location within Poland
- Coordinates: 52°44′31″N 20°50′02″E
- Country: Poland
- Voivodeship: Masovian
- County: Pułtusk
- Gmina: Gzy

Szyszki-Folwark (Polish pronunciation: [ˈʂɨʂkʲi ˈfɔlvark]) is a village in the administrative district of Gmina Gzy, within Pułtusk County, Masovian Voivodeship, in east-central Poland.
