= Świercze-Siółki =

- Village
- Location within Poland
- Coordinates: 52°39′39″N 20°45′36″E
- Country: Poland
- Voivodeship: Masovian
- County: Pułtusk
- Gmina: Świercze
- Population (2011): 71
- Postal code: 06-150
- Area code: 23
- Geocode: 0128668

Świercze-Siółki (Polish pronunciation: [ˈɕfjɛrt͡ʂɛ ˈɕuwkʲi]) is a village in the administrative district of Gmina Świercze, within Pułtusk County, Masovian Voivodeship, in east-central Poland. The population as of 2021 is estimated to be at 61 residents.
