= Mieszki-Leśniki =

Village in Gmina Winnica, Poland

- Village
- Location within Poland
- Coordinates: 52°36′15″N 20°57′23″E
- Country: Poland
- Voivodeship: Masovian
- County: Pułtusk
- Gmina: Winnica

Mieszki-Leśniki [ˈmjɛʂki lɛɕˈniki] is a village in the administrative district of Gmina Winnica, within Pułtusk County, Masovian Voivodeship, in east-central Poland.
