= Domosław, Masovian Voivodeship =

Domosław
- Village
- Location within Poland
- Coordinates: 52°38′N 20°58′E
- Country: Poland
- Voivodeship: Masovian
- County: Pułtusk
- Gmina: Winnica

Domosław [dɔˈmɔswaf] is a village in the administrative district of Gmina Winnica, within Pułtusk County, Masovian Voivodeship, in east-central Poland. The Narew flows through the village. The name is derived from the Old Slavic name Domasław, meaning "one who brings fame to the house" (from dom - house and sław - fame/glory).

== History ==
Historically, the village was part of the Land of Pułtusk. Following the Partitions of Poland in the late 18th century, it fell under Prussian rule, then the Duchy of Warsaw, and eventually the Congress Poland under the Russian Empire.
