= Mokrus, Masovian Voivodeship =

Mokrus
- Village
- Location within Poland
- Coordinates: 52°43′56″N 21°18′17″E
- Country: Poland
- Voivodeship: Masovian
- County: Pułtusk
- Gmina: Obryte

Mokrus [ˈmɔkrus] is a village in the administrative district of Gmina Obryte, within Pułtusk County, Masovian Voivodeship, in east-central Poland.
