= Budy Ciepielińskie =

Village in Gmina Pokrzywnica, Poland

- Village
- Location within Poland
- Coordinates: 52°34′32″N 21°0′59″E
- Country: Poland
- Voivodeship: Masovian
- County: Pułtusk
- Gmina: Pokrzywnica

Budy Ciepielińskie [ˈbudɨ t͡ɕɛpjɛˈliɲskʲɛ] is a village in the administrative district of Gmina Pokrzywnica, within Pułtusk County, Masovian Voivodeship, in east-central Poland.
