= Poniaty Wielkie =

- Village
- Location within Poland
- Coordinates: 52°36′N 20°53′E
- Country: Poland
- Voivodeship: Masovian
- County: Pułtusk
- Gmina: Winnica

Poniaty Wielkie [pɔˈɲatɨ ˈvjɛlkʲɛ] is a village in the administrative district of Gmina Winnica, within Pułtusk County, Masovian Voivodeship, in east-central Poland.
