= Łosewo, Masovian Voivodeship =

Łosewo
- Village
- Location within Poland
- Coordinates: 52°35′14″N 20°58′59″E
- Country: Poland
- Voivodeship: Masovian
- County: Pułtusk
- Gmina: Pokrzywnica

Łosewo [wɔˈsɛvɔ] is a village in the administrative district of Gmina Pokrzywnica, within Pułtusk County, Masovian Voivodeship, in east-central Poland.
