= Klukówek =

- Village
- Location within Poland
- Coordinates: 52°41′N 20°44′E
- Country: Poland
- Voivodeship: Masovian
- County: Pułtusk
- Gmina: Świercze

Klukówek [kluˈkuvɛk] is a village in the administrative district of Gmina Świercze, within Pułtusk County, Masovian Voivodeship, in east-central Poland.
