= Gatka, Pułtusk County =

Gatka
- Village
- Location within Poland
- Coordinates: 52°34′23″N 20°57′04″E
- Country: Poland
- Voivodeship: Masovian
- County: Pułtusk
- Gmina: Winnica

Gatka (Polish pronunciation: [ˈɡatka]) is a village in the administrative district of Gmina Winnica, within Pułtusk County, Masovian Voivodeship, in east-central Poland.
