= Chmielewo, Gmina Świercze =

Chmielewo
- Village
- Location within Poland
- Coordinates: 52°38′17″N 20°49′29″E
- Country: Poland
- Voivodeship: Masovian
- County: Pułtusk
- Gmina: Świercze

Chmielewo [xmjɛˈlɛvɔ] is a village in the administrative district of Gmina Świercze, within Pułtusk County, Masovian Voivodeship, in east-central Poland.
