= Kęsy-Wypychy =

Village in Gmina Gzy, Poland

- Village
- Location within Poland
- Coordinates: 52°42′1″N 20°54′24″E
- Country: Poland
- Voivodeship: Masovian
- County: Pułtusk
- Gmina: Gzy

Kęsy-Wypychy [ˈkɛ̃sɨ vɨˈpɨxɨ] is a village in the administrative district of Gmina Gzy, within Pułtusk County, Masovian Voivodeship, in east-central Poland.
