= Strzyże, Pułtusk County =

Strzyże
- Village
- Location within Poland
- Coordinates: 52°37′37″N 21°5′54″E
- Country: Poland
- Voivodeship: Masovian
- County: Pułtusk
- Gmina: Pokrzywnica

Strzyże [ˈstʂɨʐɛ] is a village in the administrative district of Gmina Pokrzywnica, within Pułtusk County, Masovian Voivodeship, in east-central Poland.
