= Nowe Przewodowo =

- Village
- Location within Poland
- Coordinates: 52°43′26″N 20°59′1″E
- Country: Poland
- Voivodeship: Masovian
- County: Pułtusk
- Gmina: Gzy
- Population (approx.): 80

Nowe Przewodowo [ˈnɔvɛ pʂɛvɔˈdɔvɔ] is a village in the administrative district of Gmina Gzy, within Pułtusk County, Masovian Voivodeship, in east-central Poland.
