= Kamionna, Pułtusk County =

Kamionna
- Village
- Location within Poland
- Coordinates: 52°36′N 20°55′E
- Country: Poland
- Voivodeship: Masovian
- County: Pułtusk
- Gmina: Winnica

Kamionna [kaˈmjɔnna] is a village in the administrative district of Gmina Winnica, within Pułtusk County, Masovian Voivodeship, in east-central Poland.
