= Brodowo, Masovian Voivodeship =

Brodowo
- Village
- Location within Poland
- Coordinates: 52°41′N 20°51′E
- Country: Poland
- Voivodeship: Masovian
- County: Pułtusk
- Gmina: Świercze

Brodowo [brɔˈdɔvɔ] is a village in the administrative district of Gmina Świercze, within Pułtusk County, Masovian Voivodeship, in east-central Poland.
