= Sokołowo-Parcele =

- Village
- Location within Poland
- Coordinates: 52°44′44″N 21°18′19″E
- Country: Poland
- Voivodeship: Masovian
- County: Pułtusk
- Gmina: Obryte

Sokołowo-Parcele [sɔkɔˈwɔvɔ parˈt͡sɛlɛ] is a village in the administrative district of Gmina Obryte, within Pułtusk County, Masovian Voivodeship, in east-central Poland.

== See also ==
- Parcele, Pomeranian Voivodeship
- Sokołowo
