= Cygany, Masovian Voivodeship =

Cygany
- Village
- Location within Poland
- Coordinates: 52°44′27″N 21°19′52″E
- Country: Poland
- Voivodeship: Masovian
- County: Pułtusk
- Gmina: Obryte

Cygany [t͡sɨˈɡanɨ] is a village in the administrative district of Gmina Obryte, within Pułtusk County, Masovian Voivodeship, in east-central Poland.
