= Białe Błoto, Pułtusk County =

Białe Błoto
- Village
- Location within Poland
- Coordinates: 52°35′30″N 20°56′1″E
- Country: Poland
- Voivodeship: Masovian
- County: Pułtusk
- Gmina: Winnica

Białe Błoto [ˈbjawɛ ˈbwɔtɔ] is a village in the administrative district of Gmina Winnica, within Pułtusk County, Masovian Voivodeship, in east-central Poland.
