= Golądkowo =

- Village
- Location within Poland
- Coordinates: 52°39′N 21°0′E
- Country: Poland
- Voivodeship: Masovian
- County: Pułtusk
- Gmina: Winnica
- Population: 260

Golądkowo [ɡɔlɔntˈkɔvɔ] is a village in the administrative district of Gmina Winnica, within Pułtusk County, Masovian Voivodeship, in east-central Poland.
