= Kesi =

Kesi or KESI may refer to:

== People ==
- Kesi (Ganadhara), 6th century Jain monk and leader of an order of monks
- Kesi Afalava (born 1961), American football player
- N. Kesi (1918–2015), Indian Carnatic flautist
- Pat Kesi (born 1973), American football player
- Sampan Kesi (born 1999), Thai footballer
- Kesi (rapper), stage name of Danish rapper and songwriter Oliver Kesi Chambuso (born 1992)

== KESI ==
- Korea Elevator Safety Institute, a South Korean government agency
- KESI, a Texas-based radio station now known as KVLY (FM)
- "KESI", a 2021 song from Mis Manos by Camilo

== Other uses ==
- Kesi (tapestry), a very luxurious form of Chinese silk tapestry
- Kyethi, also spelled Kesi, a town in Burma

== See also ==
- Kessi, Brazilian footballer Kessi Isac dos Santos (born 1994)
- Kešši, a mythical character
- Kesy (disambiguation)
