= Ciółkowo Małe =

Village in Gmina Obryte, Poland

- Village
- Location within Poland
- Coordinates: 52°44′01″N 21°14′02″E
- Country: Poland
- Voivodeship: Masovian
- County: Pułtusk
- Gmina: Obryte

Ciółkowo Małe [t͡ɕuu̯ˈkɔvɔ ˈmawɛ] is a village in the administrative district of Gmina Obryte, within Pułtusk County, Masovian Voivodeship, in east-central Poland.
