= Wielgolas, Pułtusk County =

Wielgolas
- Village
- Location within Poland
- Coordinates: 52°41′N 21°14′E
- Country: Poland
- Voivodeship: Masovian
- County: Pułtusk
- Gmina: Obryte

Wielgolas [vjɛlˈɡɔlas] is a village in the administrative district of Gmina Obryte, within Pułtusk County, Masovian Voivodeship, in east-central Poland.
