= Niestępowo Włościańskie =

- Village
- Location within Poland
- Coordinates: 52°39′11″N 21°1′59″E
- Country: Poland
- Voivodeship: Masovian
- County: Pułtusk
- Gmina: Pokrzywnica

Niestępowo Włościańskie (Polish pronunciation: [ɲɛstɛmˈpɔvɔ vwɔɕˈtɕaj̃skʲɛ]) is a village in the administrative district of Gmina Pokrzywnica, within Pułtusk County, Masovian Voivodeship, in east-central Poland.
