= Wójty-Trojany =

- Village
- Location within Poland
- Coordinates: 52°47′15″N 20°57′36″E
- Country: Poland
- Voivodeship: Masovian
- County: Pułtusk
- Gmina: Gzy

Wójty-Trojany [ˈvui̯tɨ trɔˈjanɨ] is a village in the administrative district of Gmina Gzy, within Pułtusk County, Masovian Voivodeship, in east-central Poland.
