= Tąsewy =

Village in Gmina Gzy, Poland

- Village
- Location within Poland
- Coordinates: 52°41′40″N 20°54′31″E
- Country: Poland
- Voivodeship: Masovian
- County: Pułtusk
- Gmina: Gzy

Tąsewy [tɔ̃ˈsɛvɨ] is a village in the administrative district of Gmina Gzy, within Pułtusk County, Masovian Voivodeship, in east-central Poland.
