= Klusek, Pułtusk County =

Village in Gmina Pokrzywnica, Poland

Klusek
- Village
- Location within Poland
- Coordinates: 52°33′23″N 21°4′51″E
- Country: Poland
- Voivodeship: Masovian
- County: Pułtusk
- Gmina: Pokrzywnica

Klusek [ˈklusɛk] is a village in the administrative district of Gmina Pokrzywnica, within Pułtusk County, Masovian Voivodeship, in east-central Poland.
