= Gąsiorówek =

Village in Gmina Świercze, Poland

- Village
- Location within Poland
- Coordinates: 52°42′13″N 20°52′44″E
- Country: Poland
- Voivodeship: Masovian
- County: Pułtusk
- Gmina: Świercze

Gąsiorówek [ɡɔ̃ɕɔˈruvɛk] is a village in the administrative district of Gmina Świercze, within Pułtusk County, Masovian Voivodeship, in east-central Poland.
