= Zalesie-Pacuszki =

- Village
- Location within Poland
- Coordinates: 52°42′17″N 20°56′10″E
- Country: Poland
- Voivodeship: Masovian
- County: Pułtusk
- Gmina: Gzy

Zalesie-Pacuszki [zaˈlɛɕɛ paˈt͡suʂki] is a village in the administrative district of Gmina Gzy, within Pułtusk County, Masovian Voivodeship, in east-central Poland.
