= Gostkowo, Pułtusk County =

Gostkowo
- Village
- Location within Poland
- Coordinates: 52°46′20″N 21°15′40″E
- Country: Poland
- Voivodeship: Masovian
- County: Pułtusk
- Gmina: Obryte
- Population: 80

Gostkowo [ɡɔstˈkɔvɔ] is a village in the administrative district of Gmina Obryte, within Pułtusk County, Masovian Voivodeship, in east-central Poland.
