= Koziegłowy, Pułtusk County =

Koziegłowy
- Village
- Location within Poland
- Coordinates: 52°39′25″N 21°3′19″E
- Country: Poland
- Voivodeship: Masovian
- County: Pułtusk
- Gmina: Pokrzywnica

Koziegłowy [kɔʑɛˈɡwɔvɨ] is a village in the administrative district of Gmina Pokrzywnica, within Pułtusk County, Masovian Voivodeship, in east-central Poland.
