= Begno, Pułtusk County =

Begno
- Village
- Location within Poland
- Coordinates: 52°45′N 20°50′E
- Country: Poland
- Voivodeship: Masovian
- County: Pułtusk
- Gmina: Gzy

Begno [ˈbɛɡnɔ] is a village in the administrative district of Gmina Gzy, within Pułtusk County, Masovian Voivodeship, in east-central Poland.
