= Grabówiec, Pułtusk County =

Grabówiec
- Village
- Location within Poland
- Coordinates: 52°40′29″N 21°06′45″E
- Country: Poland
- Voivodeship: Masovian
- County: Pułtusk
- Gmina: Pułtusk

Grabówiec [ɡraˈbuvjɛt͡s] is a village in the administrative district of Gmina Pułtusk, within Pułtusk County, Masovian Voivodeship, in east-central Poland.
