= Olszak, Masovian Voivodeship =

Olszak
- Village
- Location within Poland
- Coordinates: 52°43′59″N 21°04′22″E
- Country: Poland
- Voivodeship: Masovian
- County: Pułtusk
- Gmina: Pułtusk

Olszak [ˈɔlʂak] is a village in the administrative district of Gmina Pułtusk, within Pułtusk County, Masovian Voivodeship, in east-central Poland.
