= Sadykierz, Pułtusk County =

Sadykierz
- Village
- Location within Poland
- Coordinates: 52°42′N 21°18′E
- Country: Poland
- Voivodeship: Masovian
- County: Pułtusk
- Gmina: Obryte

Sadykierz [saˈdɨkʲɛʂ] is a village in the administrative district of Gmina Obryte, within Pułtusk County, Masovian Voivodeship, in east-central Poland.
