= Glinice-Domaniewo =

- Village
- Location within Poland
- Coordinates: 52°36′40″N 20°56′5″E
- Country: Poland
- Voivodeship: Masovian
- County: Pułtusk
- Gmina: Winnica

Glinice-Domaniewo [ɡliˈnit͡sɛ dɔmaˈɲɛvɔ] is a village in the administrative district of Gmina Winnica, within Pułtusk County, Masovian Voivodeship, in east-central Poland.
