= Płusy, Masovian Voivodeship =

Płusy
- Village
- Location within Poland
- Coordinates: 52°41′N 21°16′E
- Country: Poland
- Voivodeship: Masovian
- County: Pułtusk
- Gmina: Obryte

Płusy [ˈpwusɨ] is a village in the administrative district of Gmina Obryte, within Pułtusk County, Masovian Voivodeship, in east-central Poland.
