= Ciółkowo Rządowe =

Village in Gmina Obryte, Poland

- Village
- Location within Poland
- Coordinates: 52°44′16″N 21°16′02″E
- Country: Poland
- Voivodeship: Masovian
- County: Pułtusk
- Gmina: Obryte

Ciółkowo Rządowe [t͡ɕuu̯ˈkɔvɔ ʐɔnˈdɔvɛ] is a village in the administrative district of Gmina Obryte, within Pułtusk County, Masovian Voivodeship, in east-central Poland.
