= Grochy-Serwatki =

- Village
- Location within Poland
- Coordinates: 52°45′31″N 20°55′12″E
- Country: Poland
- Voivodeship: Masovian
- County: Pułtusk
- Gmina: Gzy

Grochy-Serwatki [ˈɡrɔxɨ sɛrˈvatki] is a village in the administrative district of Gmina Gzy, within Pułtusk County, Masovian Voivodeship, in east-central Poland.
