= Chmielewo, Gmina Pułtusk =

Chmielewo
- Village
- Location within Poland
- Coordinates: 52°45′40″N 21°06′53″E
- Country: Poland
- Voivodeship: Masovian
- County: Pułtusk
- Gmina: Pułtusk

Chmielewo [xmjɛˈlɛvɔ] is a village in the administrative district of Gmina Pułtusk, within Pułtusk County, Masovian Voivodeship, in east-central Poland.
