= Zaborze, Pułtusk County =

Zaborze
- Village
- Location within Poland
- Coordinates: 52°37′16″N 21°4′36″E
- Country: Poland
- Voivodeship: Masovian
- County: Pułtusk
- Gmina: Pokrzywnica

Zaborze [zaˈbɔʐɛ] is a village in the administrative district of Gmina Pokrzywnica, within Pułtusk County, Masovian Voivodeship, in east-central Poland.
