= Psary, Pułtusk County =

Psary
- Village
- Location within Poland
- Coordinates: 52°42′50″N 21°11′17″E
- Country: Poland
- Voivodeship: Masovian
- County: Pułtusk
- Gmina: Obryte
- Population: 530

Psary [ˈpsarɨ] is a village in the administrative district of Gmina Obryte, within Pułtusk County, Masovian Voivodeship, in east-central Poland.
