= Pogorzelec, Pułtusk County =

Pogorzelec
- Village
- Location within Poland
- Coordinates: 52°35′N 21°6′E
- Country: Poland
- Voivodeship: Masovian
- County: Pułtusk
- Gmina: Pokrzywnica

Pogorzelec [pɔɡɔˈʐɛlɛt͡s] is a village in the administrative district of Gmina Pokrzywnica, within Pułtusk County, Masovian Voivodeship, in east-central Poland.
