= Sokołowo Włościańskie =

Village in Gmina Obryte, Poland

- Village
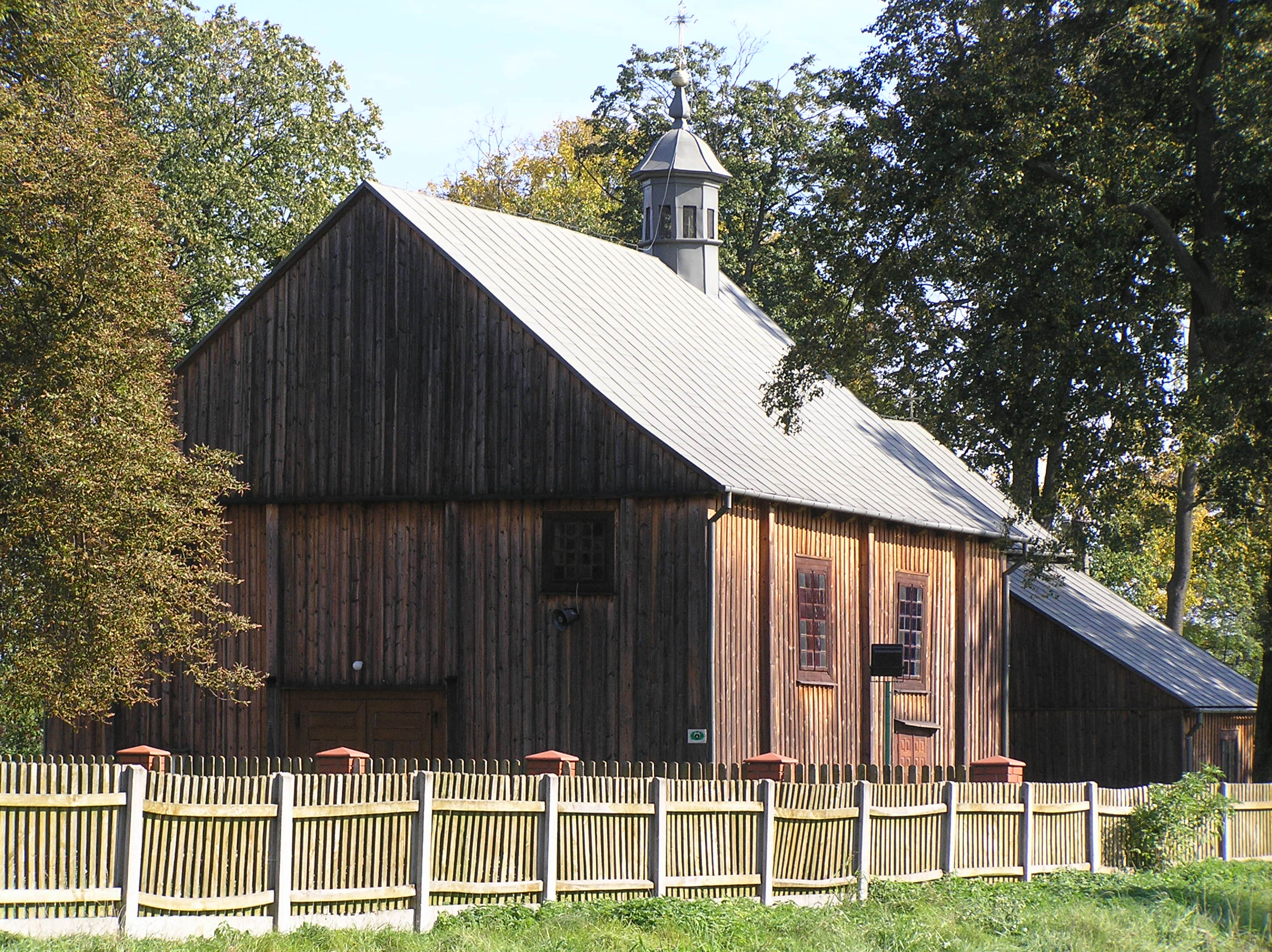

- Location within Poland
- Coordinates: 52°45′33″N 21°18′21″E
- Country: Poland
- Voivodeship: Masovian
- County: Pułtusk
- Gmina: Obryte

Sokołowo Włościańskie (Polish pronunciation: [sɔkɔˈwɔvɔ vwɔɕˈtɕaj̃skʲɛ]) is a village in the administrative district of Gmina Obryte, within Pułtusk County, Masovian Voivodeship, in east-central Poland.

== See also ==
- Sokołowo, for other villages
