= Zakręt =

Zakręt may refer to the following places:

- Zakręt, Otwock County in Masovian Voivodeship (east-central Poland)
- Zakręt, Pułtusk County in Masovian Voivodeship (east-central Poland)
- Zakręt, Warmian-Masurian Voivodeship (north Poland)
- Zakręt, historical name of the location now known as the Vingis Park, Lithuania
