= Gąsiorowo, Pułtusk County =

Gąsiorowo
- Village
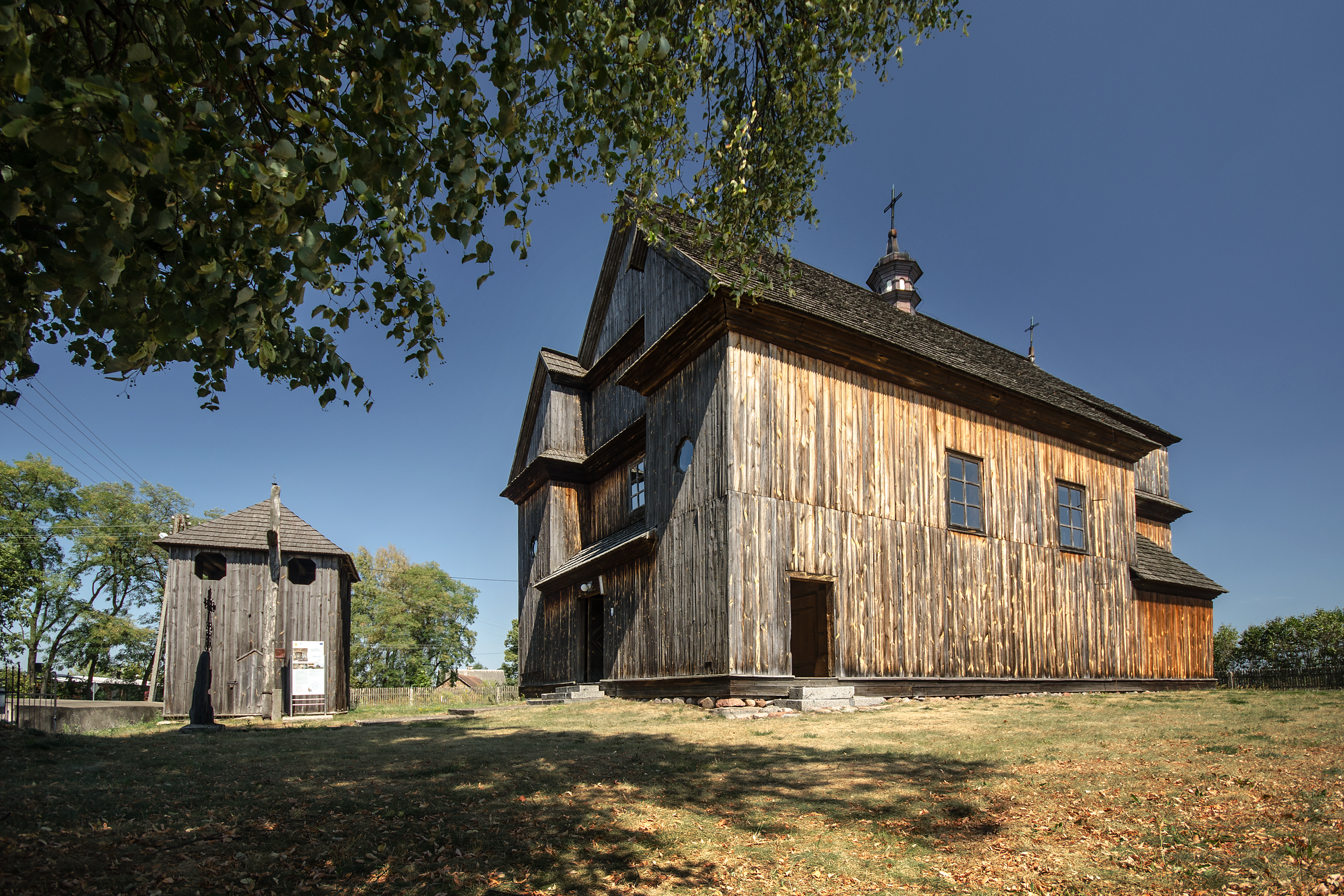

- Location within Poland
- Coordinates: 52°41′34″N 20°53′06″E
- Country: Poland
- Voivodeship: Masovian
- County: Pułtusk
- Gmina: Świercze

Gąsiorowo [ɡɔ̃ɕɔˈrɔvɔ] is a village in the administrative district of Gmina Świercze, within Pułtusk County, Masovian Voivodeship, in east-central Poland.
