= Grochy-Imbrzyki =

- Village
- Location within Poland
- Coordinates: 52°47′53″N 20°56′57″E
- Country: Poland
- Voivodeship: Masovian
- County: Pułtusk
- Gmina: Gzy

Grochy-Imbrzyki [ˈɡrɔxɨ imˈbʐɨki] is a village in the administrative district of Gmina Gzy, within Pułtusk County, Masovian Voivodeship, in east-central Poland.
