= Afalava =

Afalava is a surname. Notable people with the surname include:

- Al Afalava (born 1987), American football player
- Kesi Afalava (born 1961), Canadian football player
