= Górki-Baćki =

- Village
- Location within Poland
- Coordinates: 52°38′35″N 20°51′53″E
- Country: Poland
- Voivodeship: Masovian
- County: Pułtusk
- Gmina: Winnica

Górki-Baćki [ˈɡurki ˈbat͡ɕki] is a village in the administrative district of Gmina Winnica, within Pułtusk County, Masovian Voivodeship, in east-central Poland.
