= Piskornia, Masovian Voivodeship =

Piskornia
- Village
- Location within Poland
- Coordinates: 52°36′N 21°1′E
- Country: Poland
- Voivodeship: Masovian
- County: Pułtusk
- Gmina: Pokrzywnica

Piskornia [pisˈkɔrɲa] is a village in the administrative district of Gmina Pokrzywnica, within Pułtusk County, Masovian Voivodeship, in east-central Poland.
