= Kalinowo, Pułtusk County =

Kalinowo
- Village
- Location within Poland
- Coordinates: 52°46′14″N 21°14′39″E
- Country: Poland
- Voivodeship: Masovian
- County: Pułtusk
- Gmina: Obryte
- Population (approx.): 150

Kalinowo [kaliˈnɔvɔ] is a village in the administrative district of Gmina Obryte, within Pułtusk County, Masovian Voivodeship, in east-central Poland.
