= Wólka Zaleska, Masovian Voivodeship =

Wólka Zaleska
- Village
- Location within Poland
- Coordinates: 52°33′18″N 20°58′48″E
- Country: Poland
- Voivodeship: Masovian
- County: Pułtusk
- Gmina: Pokrzywnica

Wólka Zaleska [ˈvulka zaˈlɛska] is a village in the administrative district of Gmina Pokrzywnica, within Pułtusk County, Masovian Voivodeship, in east-central Poland.
