= Nowe Niestępowo =

- Village
- Location within Poland
- Coordinates: 52°38′N 21°2′E
- Country: Poland
- Voivodeship: Masovian
- County: Pułtusk
- Gmina: Pokrzywnica
- Population: 170

Nowe Niestępowo [ˈnɔvɛ ɲɛstɛmˈpɔvɔ] is a village in the administrative district of Gmina Pokrzywnica, within Pułtusk County, Masovian Voivodeship, in east-central Poland.
