= Gnojno, Masovian Voivodeship =

Gnojno
- Village
- Location within Poland
- Coordinates: 52°47′N 21°10′E
- Country: Poland
- Voivodeship: Masovian
- County: Pułtusk
- Gmina: Pułtusk

Gnojno [ˈɡnɔi̯nɔ] is a village in the administrative district of Gmina Pułtusk, within Pułtusk County, Masovian Voivodeship, in east-central Poland.
