= Bartodzieje, Pułtusk County =

Bartodzieje
- Village
- Location within Poland
- Coordinates: 52°42′N 21°12′E
- Country: Poland
- Voivodeship: Masovian
- County: Pułtusk
- Gmina: Obryte

Bartodzieje [bartɔˈd͡ʑɛjɛ] is a village in the administrative district of Gmina Obryte, within Pułtusk County, Masovian Voivodeship, in east-central Poland.
