= Trzciniec, Pułtusk County =

Trzciniec
- Village
- Location within Poland
- Coordinates: 52°46′N 21°1′E
- Country: Poland
- Voivodeship: Masovian
- County: Pułtusk
- Gmina: Pułtusk
- Time zone: UTC+1 (CET)
  - Summer (DST): UTC+2 (CEST)

Trzciniec [ˈtʂt͡ɕiɲɛt͡s] is a village in the administrative district of Gmina Pułtusk, within Pułtusk County, Masovian Voivodeship, in east-central Poland.

== History ==
Three Polish citizens were murdered by Nazi Germany in the village during World War II.
