= Pawłówek, Pułtusk County =

Pawłówek
- Village
- Location within Poland
- Coordinates: 52°44′29″N 21°07′06″E
- Country: Poland
- Voivodeship: Masovian
- County: Pułtusk
- Gmina: Pułtusk

Pawłówek [paˈvwuvɛk] is a village in the administrative district of Gmina Pułtusk, within Pułtusk County, Masovian Voivodeship, in east-central Poland.
