= Żeromin Drugi =

- Village
- Location within Poland
- Coordinates: 52°45′05″N 20°56′12″E
- Country: Poland
- Voivodeship: Masovian
- County: Pułtusk
- Gmina: Gzy

Żeromin Drugi [ʐɛˈrɔmin ˈdruɡi] is a village in the administrative district of Gmina Gzy, within Pułtusk County, Masovian Voivodeship, in east-central Poland.
