= Obrębek =

Village in Gmina Pokrzywnica, Poland

- Village
- Location within Poland
- Coordinates: 52°37′5″N 21°2′56″E
- Country: Poland
- Voivodeship: Masovian
- County: Pułtusk
- Gmina: Pokrzywnica

Obrębek [ɔˈbrɛmbɛk] is a village in the administrative district of Gmina Pokrzywnica, within Pułtusk County, Masovian Voivodeship, in east-central Poland.
