= Tocznabiel =

- Village
- Location within Poland
- Coordinates: 52°44′17″N 21°10′24″E
- Country: Poland
- Voivodeship: Masovian
- County: Pułtusk
- Gmina: Obryte

Tocznabiel [tɔt͡ʂˈnabjɛl] is a village in the administrative district of Gmina Obryte, within Pułtusk County, Masovian Voivodeship, in east-central Poland.
