= Ostaszewo-Pańki =

Village in Gmina Gzy, Poland

- Village
- Location within Poland
- Coordinates: 52°44′28″N 20°49′14″E
- Country: Poland
- Voivodeship: Masovian
- County: Pułtusk
- Gmina: Gzy

Ostaszewo-Pańki [ɔstaˈʂɛvɔ ˈpaɲki] is a village in the administrative district of Gmina Gzy, within Pułtusk County, Masovian Voivodeship, in east-central Poland.
