= Dębiny =

Dębiny may refer to the following places in Poland:

- Dębiny, Sępólno County in Kuyavian-Pomeranian Voivodeship (north-central Poland)
- Dębiny, Toruń County in Kuyavian-Pomeranian Voivodeship (north-central Poland)
- Dębiny, Lubartów County in Lublin Voivodeship (east Poland)
- Dębiny, Gmina Opole Lubelskie in Opole County, Lublin Voivodeship (east Poland)
- Dębiny, Przasnysz County in Masovian Voivodeship (east-central Poland)
- Dębiny, Przysucha County in Masovian Voivodeship (east-central Poland)
- Dębiny, Pułtusk County in Masovian Voivodeship (east-central Poland)
- Dębiny, Gmina Gzy in Masovian Voivodeship (east-central Poland)
- Dębiny, Podkarpackie Voivodeship (south-east Poland)
- Dębiny, Warmian-Masurian Voivodeship (north Poland)

== See also ==
- Dębiny Osuchowskie
