= Gnaty-Wieśniany =

Village in Gmina Winnica, Poland

- Village
- Location within Poland
- Coordinates: 52°39′49″N 20°54′37″E
- Country: Poland
- Voivodeship: Masovian
- County: Pułtusk
- Gmina: Winnica

Gnaty-Wieśniany [ˈɡnatɨ vjɛɕˈɲanɨ] is a village in the administrative district of Gmina Winnica, within Pułtusk County, Masovian Voivodeship, in east-central Poland.
