= Gotardy =

- Village
- Location within Poland
- Coordinates: 52°43′51″N 20°47′33″E
- Country: Poland
- Voivodeship: Masovian
- County: Pułtusk
- Gmina: Gzy

Gotardy [ɡɔˈtardɨ] is a village in the administrative district of Gmina Gzy, in Pułtusk County, Masovian Voivodeship, in east-central Poland.
