= Pękowo, Masovian Voivodeship =

Pękowo
- Village
- Location within Poland
- Coordinates: 52°45′N 20°59′E
- Country: Poland
- Voivodeship: Masovian
- County: Pułtusk
- Gmina: Gzy

Pękowo [pɛŋˈkɔvɔ] is a village in the administrative district of Gmina Gzy, within Pułtusk County, Masovian Voivodeship, in east-central Poland.
