= Godacze, Pułtusk County =

Godacze
- Village
- Location within Poland
- Coordinates: 52°42′N 20°47′E
- Country: Poland
- Voivodeship: Masovian
- County: Pułtusk
- Gmina: Świercze

Godacze [ɡɔˈdat͡ʂɛ] is a village in the administrative district of Gmina Świercze, within Pułtusk County, Masovian Voivodeship, in east-central Poland.
