= Budy Pobyłkowskie =

Village in Gmina Pokrzywnica, Poland

- Village
- Location within Poland
- Coordinates: 52°33′26″N 20°59′39″E
- Country: Poland
- Voivodeship: Masovian
- County: Pułtusk
- Gmina: Pokrzywnica

Budy Pobyłkowskie [ˈbudɨ pɔbɨu̯ˈkɔfskʲɛ] is a village in the administrative district of Gmina Pokrzywnica, within Pułtusk County, Masovian Voivodeship, in east-central Poland.
