= Ostaszewo Wielkie =

- Village
- Location within Poland
- Coordinates: 52°45′N 20°48′E
- Country: Poland
- Voivodeship: Masovian
- County: Pułtusk
- Gmina: Gzy

Ostaszewo Wielkie [ɔstaˈʂɛvɔ ˈvjɛlkʲɛ] is a village in the administrative district of Gmina Gzy, within Pułtusk County, Masovian Voivodeship, in east-central Poland.
