= Dzierżenin =

- Village
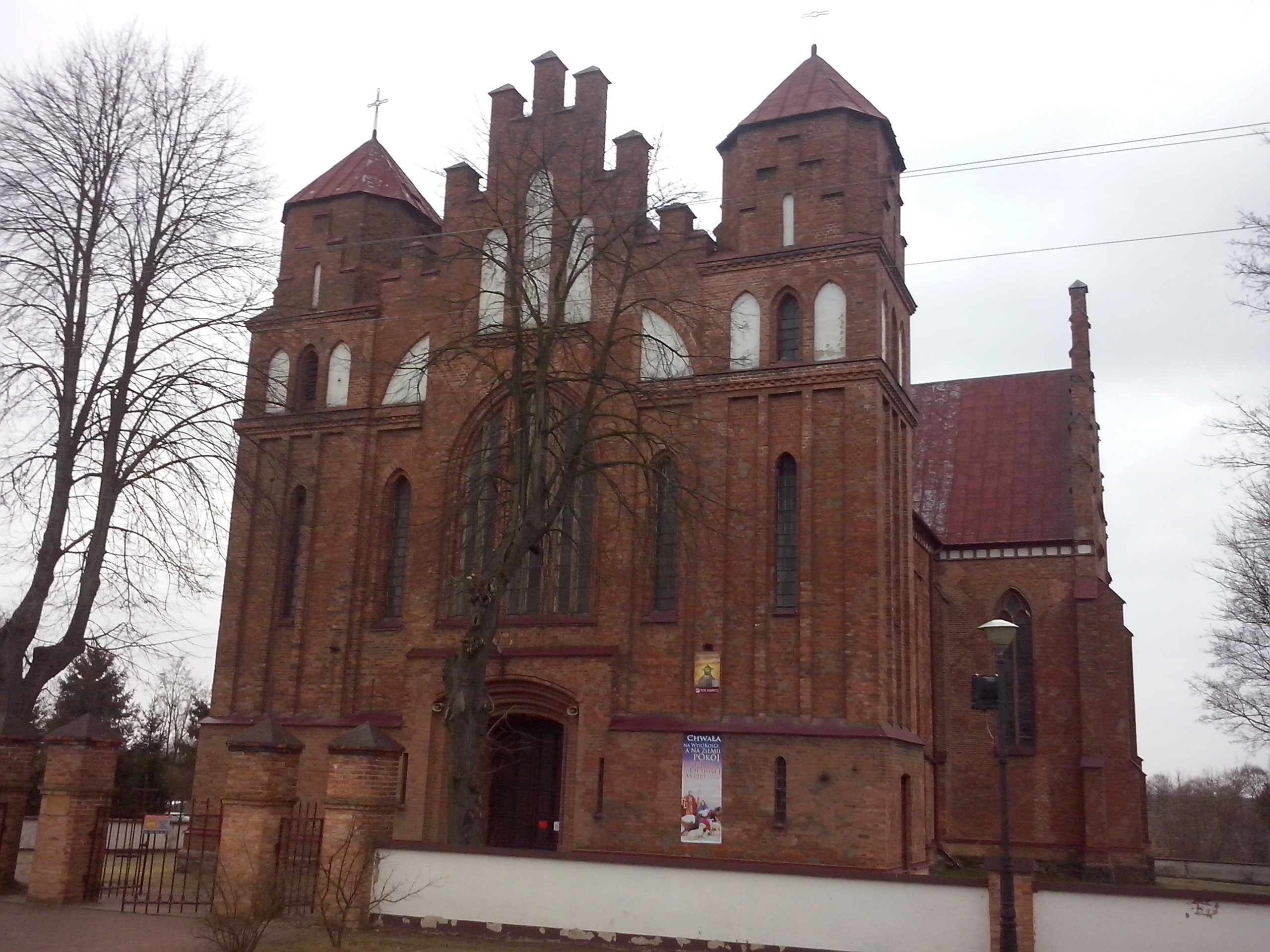

- Location within Poland
- Coordinates: 52°34′11″N 21°5′19″E
- Country: Poland
- Voivodeship: Masovian
- County: Pułtusk
- Gmina: Pokrzywnica

Dzierżenin [d͡ʑɛrˈʐɛnin] is a village in the administrative district of Gmina Pokrzywnica, within Pułtusk County, Masovian Voivodeship, in east-central Poland.
