= GZY =

GZY or Gzy may refer to:

- Gzy, Masovian Voivodeship, village in Poland
- GZY, telegraph code for Guozhen railway station, China
- GZY, Pinyin code for Guangzhou Baiyun railway station, China
