= Łubienica-Superunki =

Village in Gmina Pokrzywnica, Poland

- Village
- Location within Poland
- Coordinates: 52°38′21″N 21°4′32″E
- Country: Poland
- Voivodeship: Masovian
- County: Pułtusk
- Gmina: Pokrzywnica

Łubienica-Superunki [wubjɛˈnit͡sa supɛˈruŋki] is a village in the administrative district of Gmina Pokrzywnica, within Pułtusk County, Masovian Voivodeship, in east-central Poland.
