= Winniczka =

- Village
- Location within Poland
- Coordinates: 52°38′50″N 20°56′41″E
- Country: Poland
- Voivodeship: Masovian
- County: Pułtusk
- Gmina: Winnica

Winniczka [vinˈnit͡ʂka] is a village in the administrative district of Gmina Winnica, within Pułtusk County, Masovian Voivodeship, in east-central Poland.
