= Górki Duże =

Górki Duże may refer to the following places in Poland:

- Górki Duże, Łódź Voivodeship (central Poland)
- Górki Duże, Masovian Voivodeship (east-central Poland)
