= Kępiaste, Pułtusk County =

Kępiaste
- Village
- Location within Poland
- Coordinates: 52°32′37″N 20°59′54″E
- Country: Poland
- Voivodeship: Masovian
- County: Pułtusk
- Gmina: Pokrzywnica
- Elevation: 99 m (325 ft)

Kępiaste [kɛmˈpjastɛ] is a village in the administrative district of Gmina Pokrzywnica, within Pułtusk County, Masovian Voivodeship, in east-central Poland.
