= Smogorzewo Pańskie =

- Village
- Location within Poland
- Coordinates: 52°35′N 20°55′E
- Country: Poland
- Voivodeship: Masovian
- County: Pułtusk
- Gmina: Winnica

Smogorzewo Pańskie (Polish pronunciation: [smɔɡɔˈʐɛvɔ ˈpaj̃skʲɛ]) is a village in the administrative district of Gmina Winnica, within Pułtusk County, Masovian Voivodeship, in east-central Poland.
