= Jeżewo, Pułtusk County =

Jeżewo
- Village
- Location within Poland
- Coordinates: 52°41′15″N 21°03′37″E
- Country: Poland
- Voivodeship: Masovian
- County: Pułtusk
- Gmina: Pułtusk

Jeżewo [jɛˈʐɛvɔ] is a village in the administrative district of Gmina Pułtusk, within Pułtusk County, Masovian Voivodeship, in east-central Poland.
