= Kokoszka, Masovian Voivodeship =

Kokoszka
- Village
- Location within Poland
- Coordinates: 52°40′N 21°0′E
- Country: Poland
- Voivodeship: Masovian
- County: Pułtusk
- Gmina: Pułtusk

Kokoszka [kɔˈkɔʂka] is a village in the administrative district of Gmina Pułtusk, within Pułtusk County, Masovian Voivodeship, in east-central Poland.
