= Kałęczyn, Pułtusk County =

Kałęczyn
- Village
- Location within Poland
- Coordinates: 52°44′23″N 20°54′52″E
- Country: Poland
- Voivodeship: Masovian
- County: Pułtusk
- Gmina: Gzy

Kałęczyn [kaˈwɛnt͡ʂɨn] is a village in the administrative district of Gmina Gzy, within Pułtusk County, Masovian Voivodeship, in east-central Poland.
