= Trzepowo =

Trzepowo may refer to:

- Trzepowo, Masovian Voivodeship, a village in Gmina Pokrzywnica district, Pułtusk County, Masovian Voivodeship, Poland
- Trzepowo, Pomeranian Voivodeship, a village in Gmina Przywidz district, Gdańsk County, Pomeranian Voivodeship, Poland
- Nowe Trzepowo, a village in Gmina Stara Biała district, Płock County, Masovian Voivodeship, Poland
