= Stpice =

- Village
- Location within Poland
- Coordinates: 52°39′N 20°49′E
- Country: Poland
- Voivodeship: Masovian
- County: Pułtusk
- Gmina: Świercze
- Population (2011): 52
- Postal code: 06-150
- Area code: 23
- Geocode: 0128616

Stpice [ˈstpit͡sɛ] is a village in the administrative district of Gmina Świercze, within Pułtusk County, Masovian Voivodeship, in east-central Poland.
