= Poniaty-Cibory =

- Village
- Location within Poland
- Coordinates: 52°36′57″N 20°52′49″E
- Country: Poland
- Voivodeship: Masovian
- County: Pułtusk
- Gmina: Winnica

Poniaty-Cibory [pɔˈɲatɨ t͡ɕiˈbɔrɨ] is a village in the administrative district of Gmina Winnica, within Pułtusk County, Masovian Voivodeship, in east-central Poland.
