= Kacice, Masovian Voivodeship =

Kacice
- Village
- Location within Poland
- Coordinates: 52°40′N 21°5′E
- Country: Poland
- Voivodeship: Masovian
- County: Pułtusk
- Gmina: Pułtusk

Kacice [kaˈt͡ɕit͡sɛ] is a village in the administrative district of Gmina Pułtusk, within Pułtusk County, Masovian Voivodeship, in east-central Poland.
