= Skłudy =

- Village
- Location within Poland
- Coordinates: 52°42′54″N 21°13′09″E
- Country: Poland
- Voivodeship: Masovian
- County: Pułtusk
- Gmina: Obryte

Skłudy [ˈskwudɨ] is a village in the administrative district of Gmina Obryte, within Pułtusk County, Masovian Voivodeship, in east-central Poland.
