= Skorosze, Pułtusk County =

Skorosze
- Village
- Location within Poland
- Coordinates: 52°41′N 20°54′E
- Country: Poland
- Voivodeship: Masovian
- County: Pułtusk
- Gmina: Winnica

Skorosze [skɔˈrɔʂɛ] is a village in the administrative district of Gmina Winnica, within Pułtusk County, Masovian Voivodeship, in east-central Poland.
