= Wysocki, Masovian Voivodeship =

Wysocki
- Village
- Location within Poland
- Coordinates: 52°44′37″N 20°53′50″E
- Country: Poland
- Voivodeship: Masovian
- County: Pułtusk
- Gmina: Gzy

Wysocki [vɨˈsɔt͡ski] is a village in the administrative district of Gmina Gzy, within Pułtusk County, Masovian Voivodeship, in east-central Poland.
