= Sulnikowo =

- Village
- Location within Poland
- Coordinates: 52°43′49″N 20°55′5″E
- Country: Poland
- Voivodeship: Masovian
- County: Pułtusk
- Gmina: Gzy

Sulnikowo [sulniˈkɔvɔ] is a village in the administrative district of Gmina Gzy, within Pułtusk County, Masovian Voivodeship, in east-central Poland.
