= Skarżyce, Masovian Voivodeship =

Skarżyce
- Village
- Location within Poland
- Coordinates: 52°39′N 20°58′E
- Country: Poland
- Voivodeship: Masovian
- County: Pułtusk
- Gmina: Winnica

Skarżyce [skarˈʐɨt͡sɛ] is a village in the administrative district of Gmina Winnica, within Pułtusk County, Masovian Voivodeship, in east-central Poland.
