= Ostaszewo =

Ostaszewo may refer to the following places:

- Ostaszewo, Kuyavian-Pomeranian Voivodeship (north-central Poland)
- Ostaszewo, Masovian Voivodeship (east-central Poland)
- Ostaszewo, Pomeranian Voivodeship (north Poland)
- Ostaszewo, Warmian-Masurian Voivodeship (north Poland)
