= Stare Zambski =

- Village
- Location within Poland
- Coordinates: 52°44′41″N 21°14′50″E
- Country: Poland
- Voivodeship: Masovian
- County: Pułtusk
- Gmina: Obryte

Stare Zambski [ˈstarɛ ˈzampski] is a village in the administrative district of Gmina Obryte, within Pułtusk County, Masovian Voivodeship, in east-central Poland.
