= Skaszewo Włościańskie =

- Village
- Location within Poland
- Coordinates: 52°43′35″N 20°51′16″E
- Country: Poland
- Voivodeship: Masovian
- County: Pułtusk
- Gmina: Gzy

Skaszewo Włościańskie (Polish pronunciation: [skaˈʂɛvɔ vwɔɕˈtɕaj̃skʲɛ]) is a village in the administrative district of Gmina Gzy, within Pułtusk County, Masovian Voivodeship, in east-central Poland.
