= Sisice =

- Village
- Location within Poland
- Coordinates: 52°42′4″N 20°57′56″E
- Country: Poland
- Voivodeship: Masovian
- County: Pułtusk
- Gmina: Gzy

Sisice [ɕiˈɕit͡sɛ] is a village in the administrative district of Gmina Gzy, within Pułtusk County, Masovian Voivodeship, in east-central Poland.
