= Górka Powielińska =

- Village
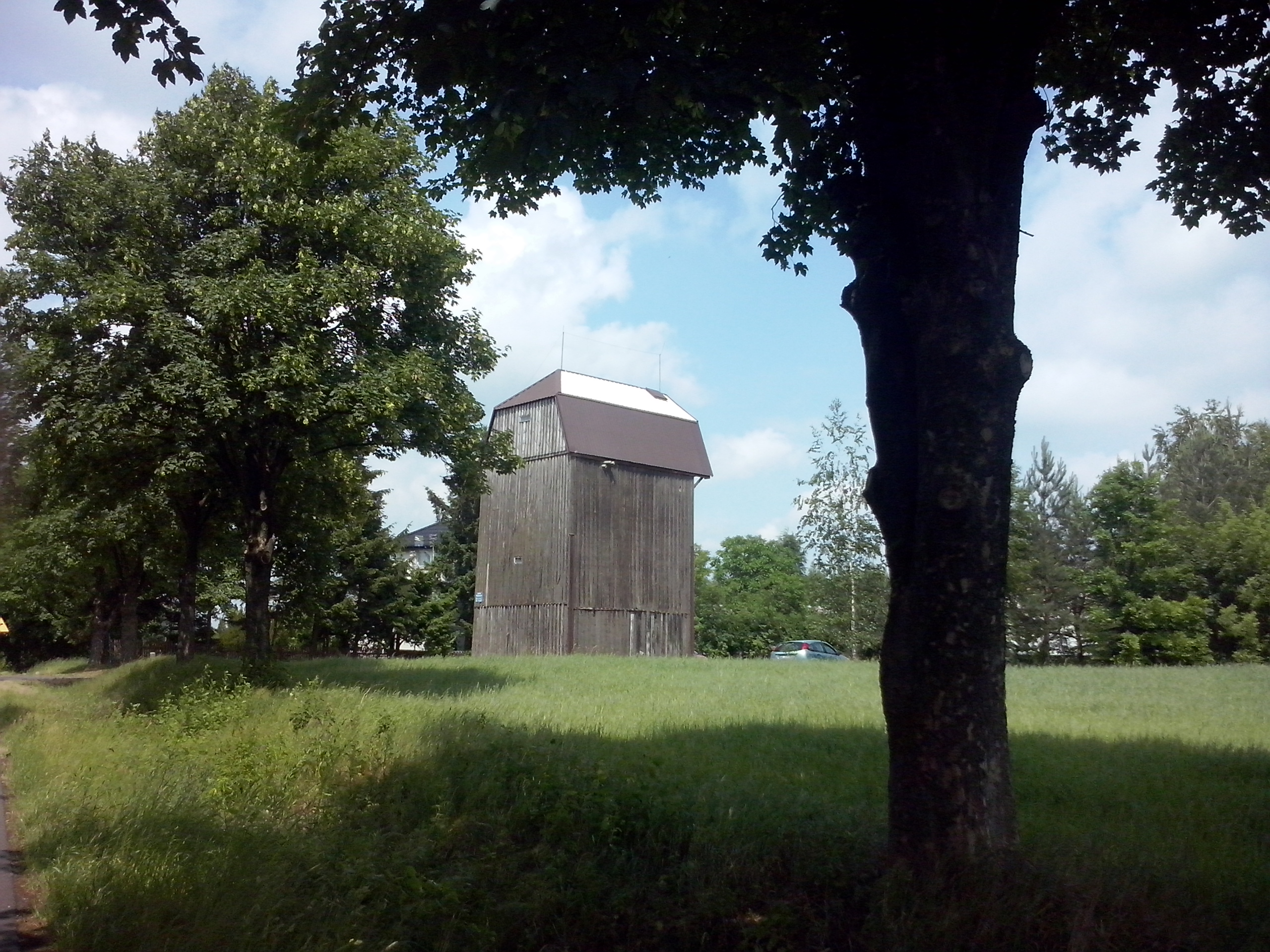

- Location within Poland
- Coordinates: 52°34′30″N 20°56′49″E
- Country: Poland
- Voivodeship: Masovian
- County: Pułtusk
- Gmina: Winnica

Górka Powielińska [ˈɡurka pɔvjɛˈliɲska] is a village located in the administrative district of Gmina Winnica, within Pułtusk County, Masovian Voivodeship, in east-central Poland.
