= Sokołowo-Kolonia =

- Village
- Country: Poland
- Voivodeship: Kuyavian-Pomeranian
- County: Włocławek
- Gmina: Brześć Kujawski

Sokołowo-Kolonia [sɔkɔˈwɔvɔ kɔˈlɔɲa] is a village in the administrative district of Gmina Brześć Kujawski, within Włocławek County, Kuyavian-Pomeranian Voivodeship, in north-central Poland.

== See also ==
- Kolonia
- Sokołowo
