= Przewodowo Poduchowne =

- Village
- Location within Poland
- Coordinates: 52°43′34″N 20°56′56″E
- Country: Poland
- Voivodeship: Masovian
- County: Pułtusk
- Gmina: Gzy

Przewodowo Poduchowne [pʂɛvɔˈdɔvɔ pɔduˈxɔvnɛ] is a village in the administrative district of Gmina Gzy, within Pułtusk County, Masovian Voivodeship, in east-central Poland.
