= Dębiny, Gmina Gzy =

Dębiny
- Village
- Location within Poland
- Coordinates: 52°42′45″N 20°58′59″E
- Country: Poland
- Voivodeship: Masovian
- County: Pułtusk
- Gmina: Gzy

Dębiny [dɛmˈbinɨ] is a village in the administrative district of Gmina Gzy, within Pułtusk County, Masovian Voivodeship, in east-central Poland.
