= Przewodowo-Parcele =

- Village
- Location within Poland
- Coordinates: 52°43′40″N 20°58′3″E
- Country: Poland
- Voivodeship: Masovian
- County: Pułtusk
- Gmina: Gzy

Przewodowo-Parcele [pʂɛvɔˈdɔvɔ parˈt͡sɛlɛ] is a village in the administrative district of Gmina Gzy, within Pułtusk County, Masovian Voivodeship, in east-central Poland.
