= Borza (surname) =

Borza is a surname. Notable people with the surname include:

- Adrian Borza (born 1985), Romanian footballer
- Alexandru Borza (1887–1971), Romanian botanist
- Bogdan Borza (born 1997), Romanian tennis player
- Eugene N. Borza (1935–2021), American history professor
- Kristy Borza (born 1986), American sports coach
- Lucia Borza (1928–2016), Hungarian folklorist
- Peppi Borza (1936–1990), British-American dancer and songwriter
