= Gmina Pułtusk =

Gmina Pułtusk Pułtusk Commune
- Gmina
- Flag Coat of arms
- Interactive map of Gmina Pułtusk
- Coordinates (Pułtusk): 52°42′N 21°5′E
- Country: Poland
- Voivodeship: Masovian
- County: Pułtusk
- Seat: Pułtusk

Area
  - Total: 133.72 km^{2} (51.63 sq mi)

Population (2023)
  - Total: 24,130
  - Density: 180.5/km^{2} (467.4/sq mi)
- Website: www.pultusk.pl

Gmina Pułtusk is an urban-rural gmina (administrative district) in Pułtusk County, Masovian Voivodeship, in east-central Poland. Its seat is the town of Pułtusk, which lies approximately 54 kilometres (34 mi) north of Warsaw.

The gmina covers an area of 133.72 square kilometres (51.6 sq mi), and as of 2023 its total population is 24,130.

== Villages ==
Apart from the town of Pułtusk, Gmina Pułtusk contains the villages and settlements of Białowieża, Boby, Chmielewo, Głodowo, Gnojno, Grabówiec, Gromin, Jeżewo, Kacice, Kleszewo, Kokoszka, Lipa, Lipniki Nowe, Lipniki Stare, Moszyn, Olszak, Pawłówek, Płocochowo, Ponikiew, Przemiarowo, Szygówek, Trzciniec and Zakręt.

== Neighbouring gminas ==
Gmina Pułtusk is bordered by the gminas of Gzy, Karniewo, Obryte, Pokrzywnica, Szelków, Winnica and Zatory.
