= Pokrzywnica, Pułtusk County =

Pokrzywnica
- Village
- Location within Poland
- Coordinates: 52°37′12″N 21°0′45″E
- Country: Poland
- Voivodeship: Masovian
- County: Pułtusk
- Gmina: Pokrzywnica
- Population: 510

Pokrzywnica [pɔkʂɨvˈnit͡sa] is a village in Pułtusk County, Masovian Voivodeship, in east-central Poland. It is the seat of the gmina (administrative district) called Gmina Pokrzywnica.
