= Borza-Przechy =

- Village
- Location within Poland
- Coordinates: 52°45′38″N 20°52′26″E
- Country: Poland
- Voivodeship: Masovian
- County: Pułtusk
- Gmina: Gzy

Borza-Przechy [ˈbɔʐa ˈpʂɛxɨ] is a village in the administrative district of Gmina Gzy, within Pułtusk County, Masovian Voivodeship, in east-central Poland.
