= Obryte, Pułtusk County =

Obryte
- Village
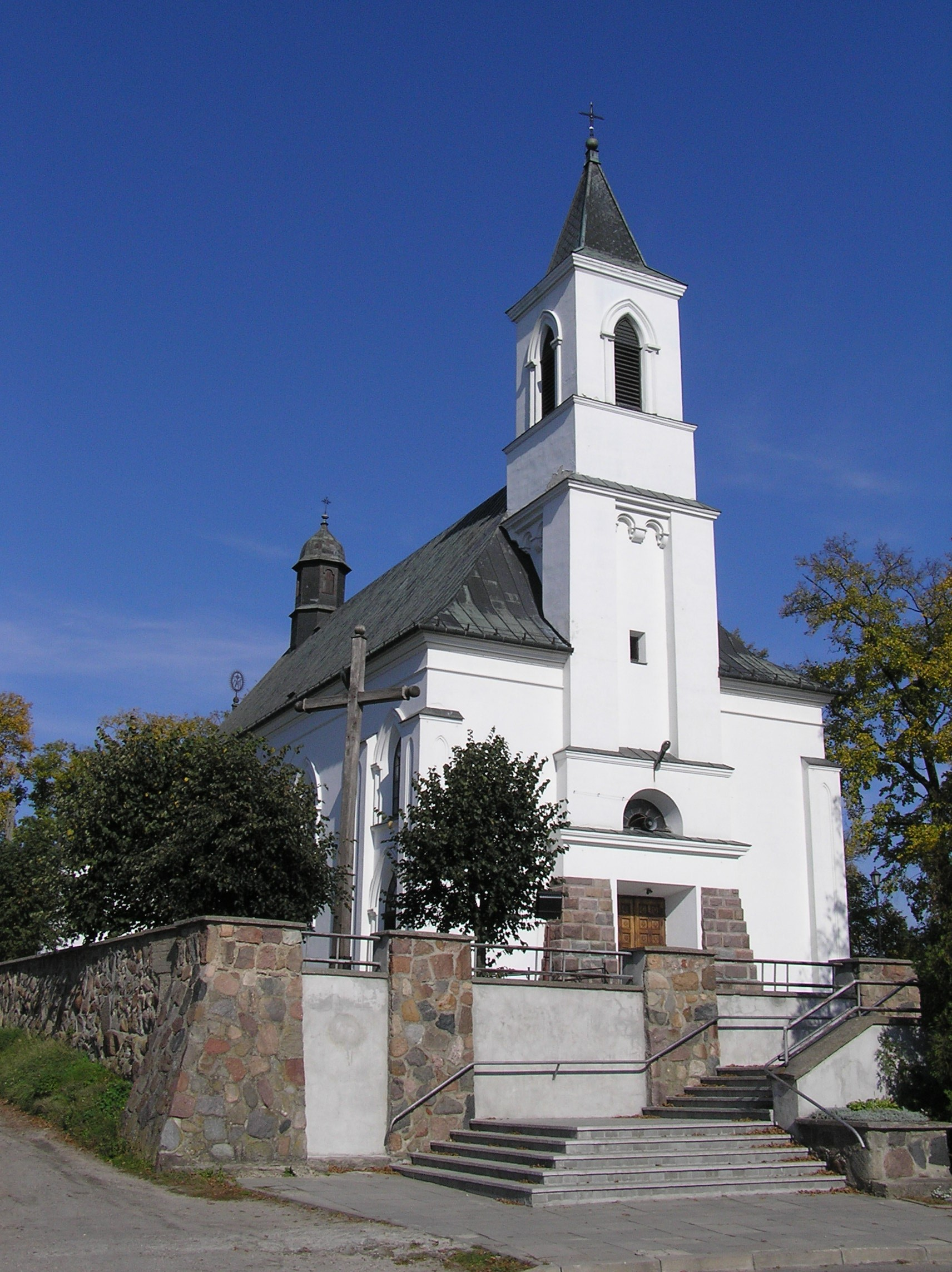
- Holy Trinity church in Obryte

- Location within Poland
- Coordinates: 52°42′59″N 21°15′10″E
- Country: Poland
- Voivodeship: Masovian
- County: Pułtusk
- Gmina: Obryte

Population (approx.)
  - Total: 930
- Time zone: UTC+1 (CET)
  - Summer (DST): UTC+2 (CEST)

Obryte [ɔˈbrɨtɛ] is a village in Pułtusk County, Masovian Voivodeship, in east-central Poland. It is the seat of the gmina (administrative district) called Gmina Obryte.

Five Polish citizens were murdered by Nazi Germany in the village during World War II.
