= Górki Duże, Masovian Voivodeship =

Górki Duże
- Village
- Location within Poland
- Coordinates: 52°38′N 20°52′E
- Country: Poland
- Voivodeship: Masovian
- County: Pułtusk
- Gmina: Winnica

Górki Duże [ˈɡurki ˈduʐɛ] is a village in the administrative district of Gmina Winnica, within Pułtusk County, Masovian Voivodeship, in east-central Poland.
