= Winnica, Pułtusk County =

Winnica
- Village
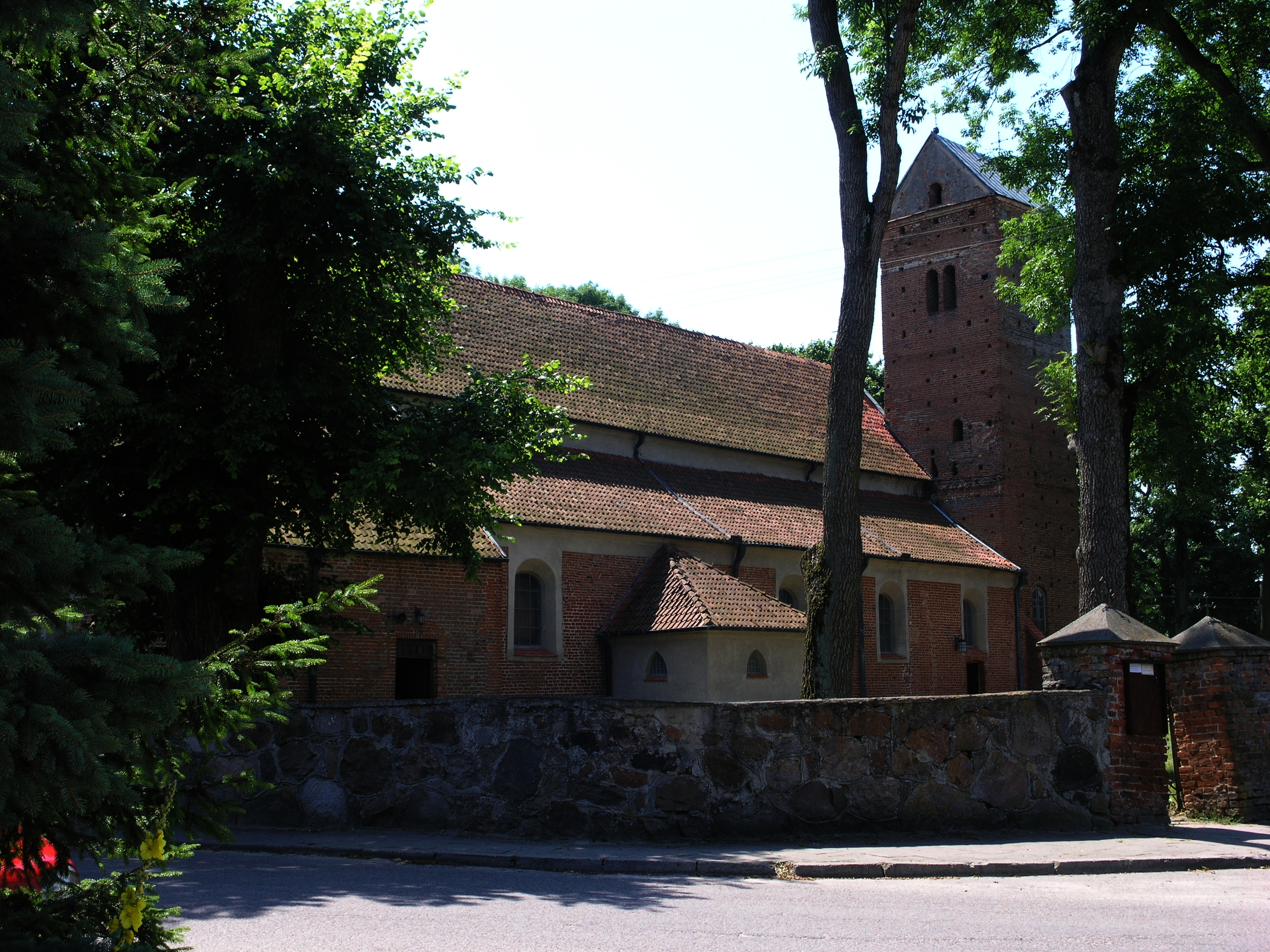
- Medieval Gothic Holy Trinity church in Winnica

- Location within Poland
- Coordinates: 52°39′N 20°57′E
- Country: Poland
- Voivodeship: Masovian
- County: Pułtusk
- Gmina: Winnica

Population (approx.)
  - Total: 560
- Time zone: UTC+1 (CET)
  - Summer (DST): UTC+2 (CEST)
- Postal code: 06-120
- Vehicle registration: WPU

Winnica [vinˈnit͡sa] is a village in Pułtusk County, Masovian Voivodeship, in east-central Poland. It is the seat of the gmina (administrative district) called Gmina Winnica.
