= Świercze, Pułtusk County =

Świercze
- Village
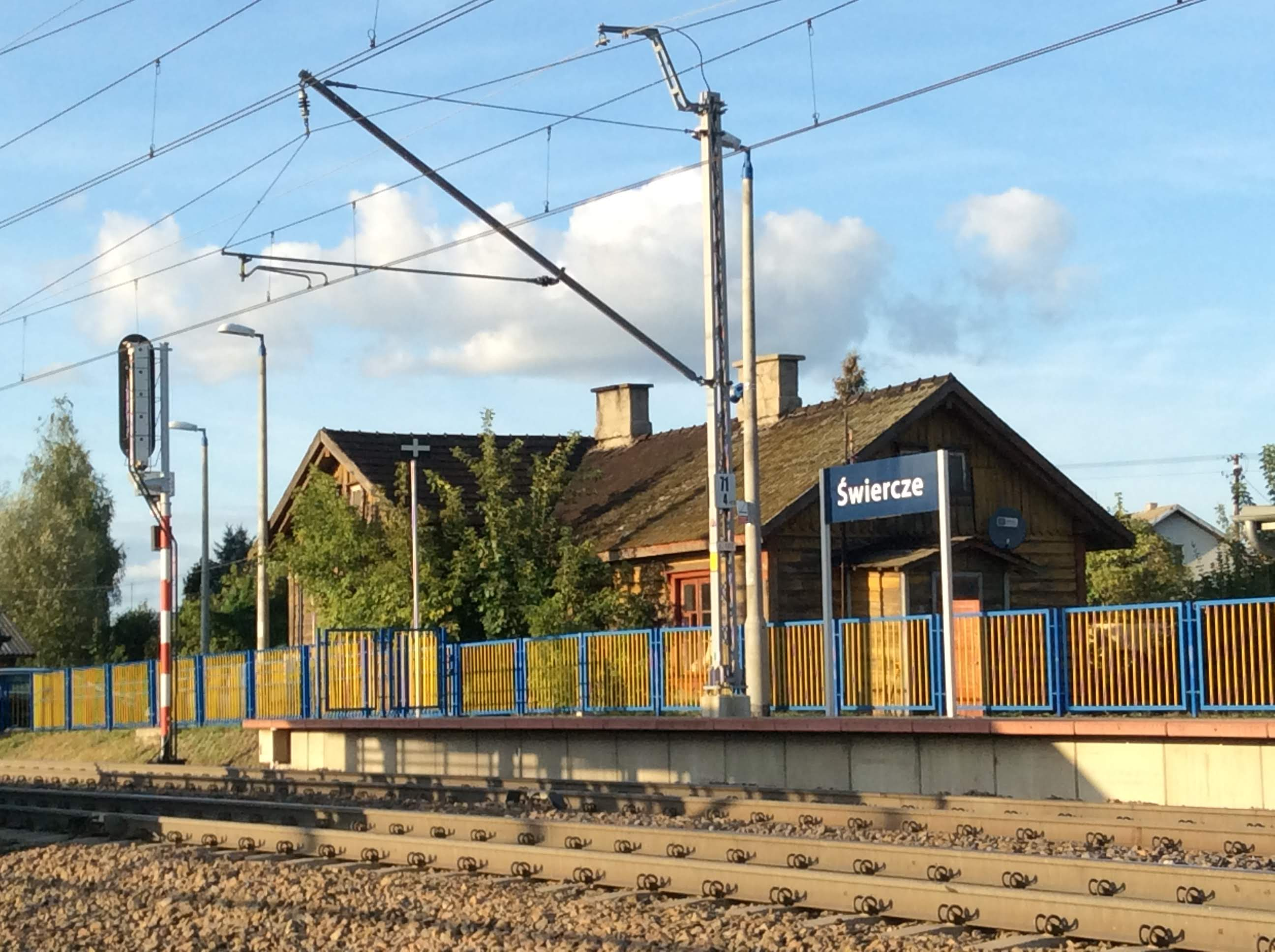
- Świercze railway station

- Location within Poland
- Coordinates: 52°40′N 20°46′E
- Country: Poland
- Voivodeship: Masovian
- County: Pułtusk
- Gmina: Świercze
- Time zone: UTC+1 (CET)
  - Summer (DST): UTC+2 (CEST)

Świercze (Polish pronunciation: [ˈɕfjɛrt͡ʂɛ]) is a village in Pułtusk County, Masovian Voivodeship, in east-central Poland. It is the seat of the gmina (administrative district) called Gmina Świercze.

Swiercze has a train station on the route from Warsaw to northern Poland. The village has several shops, a post office and bank, and a school. The village has a police station.

Five Polish citizens were murdered by Nazi Germany in the village during World War II.
