= Gmina Świercze =

Gmina Świercze Świercze Commune
- Gmina
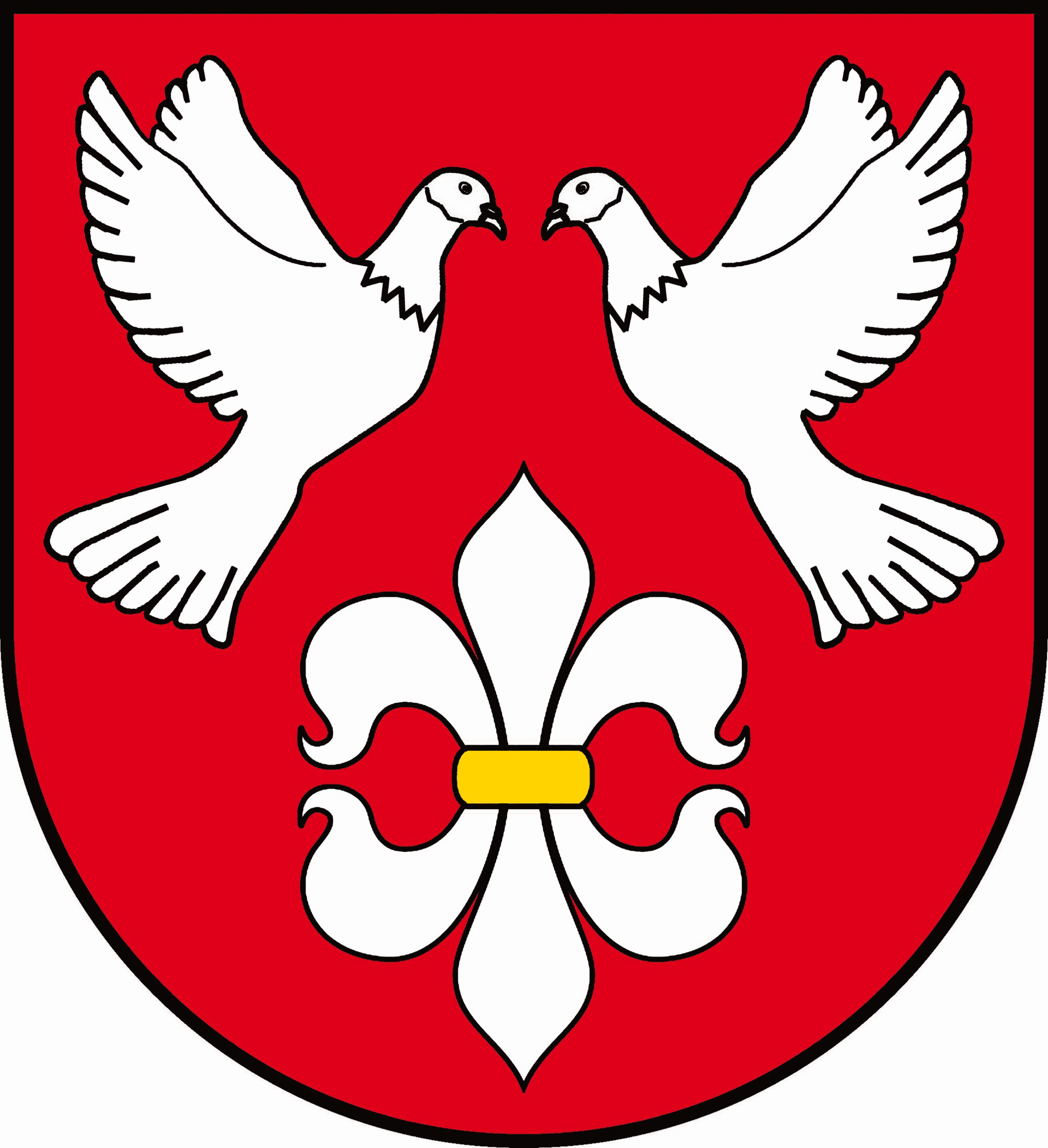
- Coat of arms

- Location within Poland
- Coordinates (Świercze): 52°40′N 20°46′E
- Country: Poland
- Voivodeship: Masovian
- County: Pułtusk
- Seat: Świercze

Area
  - Total: 93.04 km^{2} (35.92 sq mi)

Population (2011)
  - Total: 4,740
  - Density: 50.9/km^{2} (132/sq mi)

Gmina Świercze is a rural gmina (administrative district) in Pułtusk County, Masovian Voivodeship, in east-central Poland. Its seat is the village of Świercze, which lies approximately 22 kilometres (13 mi) west of Pułtusk and 52 km (32 mi) north-west of Warsaw.

The gmina covers an area of 93.04 square kilometres (35.9 sq mi), and as of 2006 its total population is 4,771 (4,740 in 2011).

== Villages ==
Gmina Świercze contains the villages and settlements of Brodowo, Bruliny, Bylice, Chmielewo, Dziarno, Gaj, Gąsiorówek, Gąsiorowo, Godacze, Gołębie, Klukówek, Klukowo, Kościesze, Kosiorowo, Kowalewice Nowe, Kowalewice Włościańskie, Ostrzeniewo, Prusinowice, Stpice, Strzegocin, Sulkowo, Świercze, Świercze-Siółki, Świerkowo, Świeszewko, Świeszewo, Wyrzyki and Wyrzyki-Pękale.

== Neighbouring gminas ==
Gmina Świercze is bordered by the gminas of Gzy, Nasielsk, Nowe Miasto, Sońsk and Winnica.
