= Gmina Obryte =

Gmina Obryte Obryte Commune
- Gmina
- Location within Poland
- Coordinates (Obryte): 52°43′N 21°15′E
- Country: Poland
- Voivodeship: Masovian
- County: Pułtusk
- Seat: Obryte

Area
  - Total: 139.73 km^{2} (53.95 sq mi)

Population (2011)
  - Total: 4,864
  - Density: 34.81/km^{2} (90.16/sq mi)

Gmina Obryte is a rural gmina (administrative district) in Pułtusk County, Masovian Voivodeship, in east-central Poland. Its seat is the village of Obryte, which lies approximately 12 kilometres (7 mi) east of Pułtusk and 59 km (37 mi) north of Warsaw.

The gmina covers an area of 139.73 square kilometres (54.0 sq mi), and as of 2006 its total population is 4,820 (4,864 in 2011).

== Villages ==
Gmina Obryte contains the villages and settlements of Bartodzieje, Ciółkowo Małe, Ciółkowo Nowe, Ciółkowo Rządowe, Cygany, Gostkowo, Gródek Rządowy, Kalinowo, Mokrus, Nowy Gródek, Obryte, Płusy, Psary, Rowy, Rozdziały, Sadykierz, Skłudy, Sokołowo Włościańskie, Sokołowo-Parcele, Stare Zambski, Tocznabiel, Ulaski, Wielgolas and Zambski Kościelne.

== Neighbouring gminas ==
Gmina Obryte is bordered by the gminas of Pułtusk, Rząśnik, Rzewnie, Szelków and Zatory.
