= Sokołowo =

Sokołowo may refer to:

- Sokołowo, Brodnica County in Kuyavian-Pomeranian Voivodeship (north-central Poland)
- Sokołowo, Golub-Dobrzyń County in Kuyavian-Pomeranian Voivodeship (north-central Poland)
- Sokołowo, Gmina Izbica Kujawska in Kuyavian-Pomeranian Voivodeship (central Poland)
- Sokołowo, Podlaskie Voivodeship (north-east Poland)
- Sokołowo, Ciechanów County in Masovian Voivodeship (north-central Poland)
- Sokołowo, Ostrołęka County in Masovian Voivodeship (east-central Poland)
- Sokołowo, Czarnków-Trzcianka County in Greater Poland Voivodeship (west-central Poland)
- Sokołowo, Gniezno County in Greater Poland Voivodeship (west-central Poland)
- Sokołowo, Koło County in Greater Poland Voivodeship (central Poland)
- Sokołowo, Września County in Greater Poland Voivodeship (west-central Poland)

== See also ==
- Sokolovo (disambiguation), South Slavic toponym
- Sokołowo Budzyńskie, in Greater Poland Voivodeship (west-central Poland)
- Sokołowo-Kolonia, in Kuyavian-Pomeranian Voivodeship (north-central Poland)
- Sokołowo-Parcele, in Masovian Voivodeship (east-central Poland)
- Sokołowo Włościańskie, in Masovian Voivodeship (in east-central Poland)
