= Gmina Pokrzywnica =

Gmina Pokrzywnica Pokrzywnica Commune
- Gmina
- Location within Poland
- Coordinates (Pokrzywnica): 52°37′12″N 21°0′45″E
- Country: Poland
- Voivodeship: Masovian
- County: Pułtusk
- Seat: Pokrzywnica

Area
  - Total: 120.99 km^{2} (46.71 sq mi)

Population (2011)
  - Total: 4,876
  - Density: 40.30/km^{2} (104.4/sq mi)
- Website: www.pokrzywnica.pl

Gmina Pokrzywnica is a rural gmina (administrative district) in Pułtusk County, Masovian Voivodeship, in east-central Poland. Its seat is the village of Pokrzywnica, which lies approximately 11 kilometres (7 mi) south-west of Pułtusk and 45 km (28 mi) north of Warsaw.

The gmina covers an area of 120.99 square kilometres (46.7 sq mi), and as of 2006 its total population is 4,734 (4,876 in 2011).

== Villages ==
Gmina Pokrzywnica contains the villages and settlements of Budy Ciepielińskie, Budy Obrębskie, Budy Pobyłkowskie, Ciepielin, Dzbanice, Dzierżenin, Gzowo, Karniewek, Kępiaste, Klaski, Klusek, Koziegłowy, Łępice, Łosewo, Łubienica, Łubienica-Superunki, Mory, Murowanka, Niestępowo Włościańskie, Nowe Niestępowo, Obręb, Obrębek, Olbrachcice, Piskornia, Pobyłkowo Duże, Pobyłkowo Małe, Pogorzelec, Pokrzywnica, Pomocnia, Strzyże, Świeszewo, Trzepowo, Witki, Wólka Zaleska and Zaborze.

== Neighbouring gminas ==
Gmina Pokrzywnica is bordered by the gminas of Pułtusk, Serock, Winnica and Zatory.
