= Świeszewo, Gmina Pokrzywnica =

Świeszewo
- Village
- Location within Poland
- Coordinates: 52°36′2″N 21°5′30″E
- Country: Poland
- Voivodeship: Masovian
- County: Pułtusk
- Gmina: Pokrzywnica
- Population: 50

Świeszewo (Polish pronunciation: [ɕfjɛˈʂɛvɔ]) is a village in the administrative district of Gmina Pokrzywnica, within Pułtusk County, Masovian Voivodeship, in east-central Poland.
