= Gmina Winnica =

Gmina Winnica Winnica Commune
- Gmina
- Location within Poland
- Coordinates (Winnica): 52°39′N 20°57′E
- Country: Poland
- Voivodeship: Masovian
- County: Pułtusk
- Seat: Winnica

Area
  - Total: 115.09 km^{2} (44.44 sq mi)

Population (2011)
  - Total: 4,100
  - Density: 36/km^{2} (92/sq mi)
- Website: www.winnica.ornet.pl

Gmina Winnica is a rural gmina (administrative district) in Pułtusk County, Masovian Voivodeship, in east-central Poland. Its seat is the village of Winnica, which lies approximately 11 kilometres (7 mi) south-west of Pułtusk and 46 km (28 mi) north of Warsaw.

The gmina covers an area of 115.09 square kilometres (44.4 sq mi), and as of 2006 its total population is 4,116 (4,100 in 2011).

== Villages ==
Gmina Winnica contains the villages and settlements of Białe Błoto, Bielany, Błędostowo, Brodowo-Bąboły, Brodowo-Wity, Budy-Zbroszki, Domosław, Gatka, Glinice Wielkie, Glinice-Domaniewo, Gnaty-Lewiski, Gnaty-Szczerbaki, Gnaty-Wieśniany, Golądkowo, Górka Powielińska, Górki Duże, Górki-Baćki, Górki-Witowice, Kamionna, Łachoń, Mieszki-Kuligi, Mieszki-Leśniki, Nowe Bulkowo, Pawłowo, Poniaty Wielkie, Poniaty-Cibory, Powielin, Rębkowo, Skarżyce, Skorosze, Skoroszki, Skórznice, Smogorzewo Pańskie, Smogorzewo Włościańskie, Stare Bulkowo, Winnica, Winniczka and Zbroszki.

== Neighbouring gminas ==
Gmina Winnica is bordered by the gminas of Gzy, Nasielsk, Pokrzywnica, Pułtusk, Serock and Świercze.
