= Borza-Strumiany =

- Village
- Location within Poland
- Coordinates: 52°45′N 20°53′E
- Country: Poland
- Voivodeship: Masovian
- County: Pułtusk
- Gmina: Gzy

Borza-Strumiany [ˈbɔʐa struˈmjanɨ] is a village in the administrative district of Gmina Gzy, within Pułtusk County, Masovian Voivodeship, in east-central Poland.
