= Ostaszewo-Włuski =

Village in Gmina Gzy, Poland

- Village
- Location within Poland
- Coordinates: 52°44′57″N 20°48′1″E
- Country: Poland
- Voivodeship: Masovian
- County: Pułtusk
- Gmina: Gzy

Ostaszewo-Włuski [ɔstaˈʂɛvɔ ˈvwuski] is a village in the administrative district of Gmina Gzy, within Pułtusk County, Masovian Voivodeship, in east-central Poland.
