= Przewodowo-Majorat =

- Village
- Location within Poland
- Coordinates: 52°43′9″N 20°58′16″E
- Country: Poland
- Voivodeship: Masovian
- County: Pułtusk
- Gmina: Gzy
- Population (approx.): 100

Przewodowo-Majorat [pʂɛvɔˈdɔvɔ maˈjɔrat] is a village in the administrative district of Gmina Gzy, within Pułtusk County, Masovian Voivodeship, in east-central Poland.
