= Lisa Grodek =

Polish-born German fashion designer (born 1987)

Lisa Grodek (born 14 August 1987) is a German and Polish fashion designer, crochet designer, and visual artist.

== Career ==
Lisa Grodek grew up in the German-Polish border region. She is the daughter of Polish aphorist and author Jerzy Grodek. She studied painting under Otto Schack Otto Schack (artist) and Juliusz Piechocki, and completed a sculpture internship with the artist Horst Engelhardt.

In 1997, Grodek discovered crocheting and has been working as a full-time crochet designer since 2018, mainly in Berlin.

Grodek's work draws on the crinoline fashion of 1842–1870, combining it with elements from the late Renaissance, early Baroque fashion, and design elements from the 1920s to the 1960s. The fabrics originally used in these fashion eras are replaced exclusively by yarn. Her works are unique pieces, which are created by hand.

== Self-supporting crinoline dress ==
A defining aesthetic feature of her work is the design element of the hoop skirt. The characteristic skirt frames under the dresses are made of yarn instead of the usual materials. The first combination of a crocheted overdress and a completely crocheted self-supporting hoop skirt was developed by her over a period of more than 10 years through physical and kinetic testing.

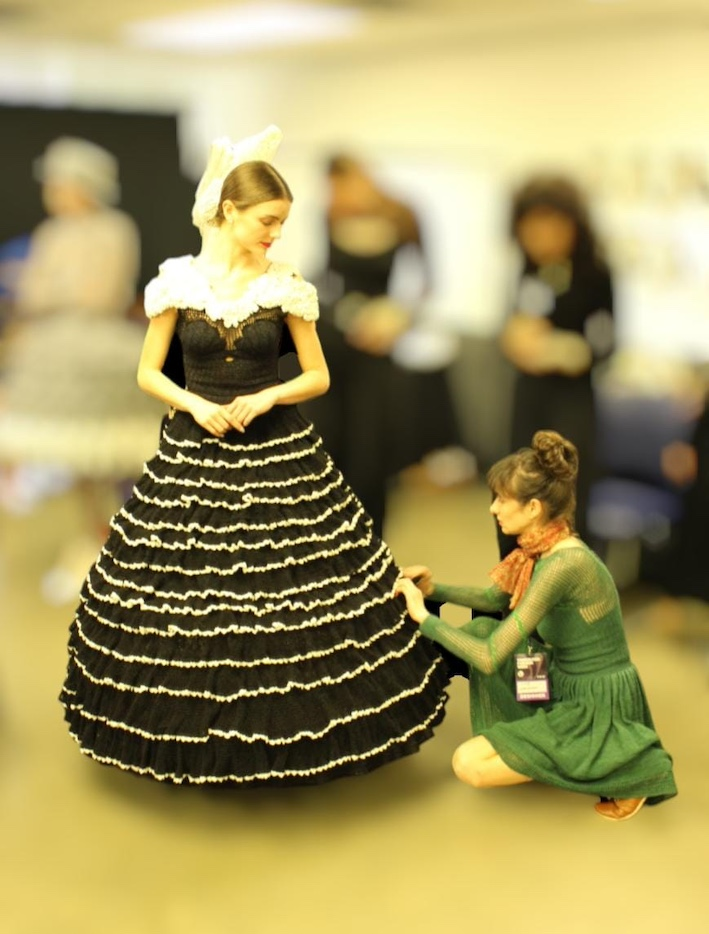
crinoline dress, Lisa Grodek 2024

== Collections and exhibitions ==
- 2014: Joint exhibition at the Philharmonic Hall in Gorzów Wielkopolski, Poland
- 2018: First place and winner of the Dortex Design Award in Dortmund
- 2018: Finalist of the L.O.B. Fashion Award in Leipzig
- 2021: First place and prize winner of the Designer and Craft Maker Fashion Award in London
- 2024: Presentation of the “Delicate Mesh” collection at Vancouver Fashion Week
