= Gzy, Masovian Voivodeship =

Gzy
- Village
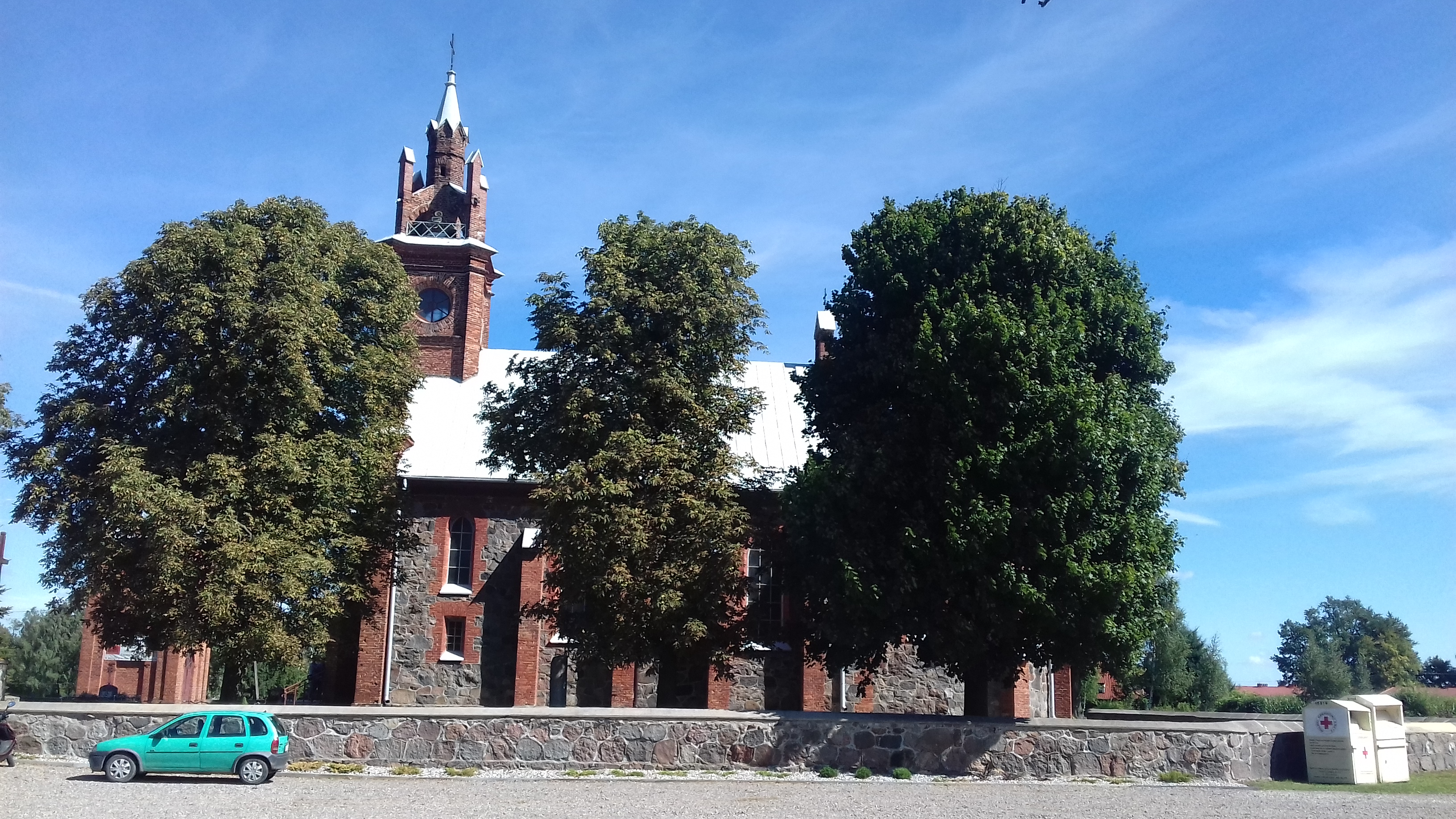

- Location within Poland
- Coordinates: 52°45′N 20°57′E
- Country: Poland
- Voivodeship: Masovian
- County: Pułtusk
- Gmina: Gzy

Gzy [ɡzɨ] is a village in Pułtusk County, Masovian Voivodeship, in east-central Poland. It is the seat of the gmina (administrative district) called Gmina Gzy.
