= Semmy Kessy =

Tanzanian footballer

Personal information
- Full name: Semmy Kessy Assani
- Date of birth: 30 November 1984 (age 41)
- Place of birth: Dar es Salaam, Tanzania
- Position: Striker

Senior career*
Years	Team	Apps	(Gls)
- Young Africans
- Bandari
2010–2011	Toto Africa		
2011–2013	African Lyon		
2013–2014	Lipuli		
2014	La Passe		
2015–2017	Madini		

International career^{‡}
2002–2006	Tanzania	3	(1)
- * Club domestic league appearances and goals as of 10 May 2021 ‡ National team caps and goals as of 10 May 2021

Semmy Kessy (born 30 November 1984) is a retired Tanzanian football striker.
