= Mindy L. Klasky =

American novelist

- Education: Princeton University
- Occupation: Novelist
- Writing career
- Genre: Fantasy

Mindy L. Klasky is an American fantasy novelist. Klasky graduated from Princeton University and eventually became a lawyer. Once she realized this did not allow her to write, she became a librarian instead. Now she writes full-time.

== List of published works ==
Glasswrights' Guild

1. The Glasswrights' Apprentice (2000)
2. The Glasswrights' Progress (2001)
3. The Glasswrights' Journeyman (2002)
4. The Glasswrights' Test (2003)
5. The Glasswrights' Master (2004)

From the author about her Glasswright series:

Rani Trader's story grows out of my own love of fantasy fiction. Rani is descended from the heros and heroines I've met and admired in the novels of Anne Bishop, Katherine Kurtz, and Patricia McKillip. At the same time, Rani is a unique, high-spirited individual - a proud, strong young woman who takes charge of the often-mystifying world around her. I hope that you will come to enjoy Rani's company as much as I have and follow her on her adventures in and around Morenia!

Jane Madison

1. Girl's Guide To Witchcraft (2006)
2. Sorcery and the Single Girl (2007)
3. Magic and the Modern Girl (2008)
4. Single Witch's Survival Guide (2013)
5. Joy of Witchcraft (2015)
- Capital Magic novella (2013)

As You Wish

1. How not to Make a Wish (October 2009)
2. When Good Wishes go Bad (April 2010)
3. To Wish or not to Wish (October 2010)

Stand Alone Novel

- Season of Sacrifice (2001)
- Fright Court (2011)

Short Stories

- "Cat and Mouse" in Not One of Us (September 1999)
- "Saving the Skychildren" in Realms of Fantasy (October 2000)
- "Catalog of Woe" in Space, Inc, ed. by Julie E. Czerneda (July 2003)
- "The Darkbeast" in Fantastic Companions, ed. by Julie Czerneda (May 2005)

== Awards ==
Klasky won the Barnes & Noble's Maiden Voyage Award in 2000 for her novel Glasswright's Apprentice.
