= Kristy Borza =

American tennis player and coach

- Country (sports): United States
- Born: 29 May 1986 (age 40) Beaver, Pennsylvania
- Height: 5 ft 4 in (1.63 m)
- College: University of Pittsburgh

Singles
- Career record: 1–1

Doubles
- Career record: 0–0

Kristy Borza (born May 29, 1986) in Beaver, Pennsylvania) was an assistant coach for the now-defunct University of Pittsburgh's Division I women's tennis team. As a player at Pitt, Borza was the all-time wins record holder, a three-time MVP, and captain of the tennis team. As a player for Beaver Area High School, Borza was a two-time place winner in the PIAA singles tournament.

== Personal life ==
Kristy's father, Barry Borza, has served as her tennis coach for her entire career. In high school, under the official coaching of Riley Baker, Kristy's total record was 120-16. A four-year tennis letterwinner, she was also a three-time section champion. Borza qualified for WPIALs all four years of high school and was ranked seventh in the USTA Middle State Section's Under-18 group.

== College career ==
Borza and was one of the University of Pittsburgh's tennis team's top player since the beginning of her college career in September 2005. Borza's Big East Conference career started strong with an impressive 8–0 record, which set the pace for the rest of her successful freshman season. By the end of the spring, she had tied Pitt's record for singles and doubles wins in one season, 26-7. Additional wins from the fall pushed her overall victory record for the year to 47, and she led her team in singles and doubles wins. Her freshman year she also started the trend of earning first place in the Carnegie Mellon University Invitational, which she has championed for three years.

With 27 wins in the spring of Borza's sophomore year, she beat the record she had tied the previous season, giving her the best record for a single season in Pitt tennis history. Early this fall as a junior, Borza entered the 2007 Eastern Women's Intercollegiate Tennis Tournament at West Point as a seventh-seed player and won the tournament. In October, after only participating in 137 matches, Borza earned her hundredth career victory, making her only the tenth player to make the 100-win club in the school's history and the fastest to do so.

As a junior, Borza became the fastest player in Pitt history to record 100 career victories after competing in just 137 career matches. Alongside then-doubles teammate Leah Friedman, Borza obtained Pitt’s first-ever ITA East region doubles ranking (No. 13) as a freshman. That was the lone ranking for any Big East school in that top-14 poll. On December 7, 2007, the Intercollegiate Tennis Association ranked her 26 for women's tennis singles in the Eastern Region.

Borza currently holds the all-time Pitt records for single-season singles wins (28), career singles wins (91), career doubles wins (85) and combined wins (176). She also ranks second in doubles wins in a season (23). Borza was also honored with three consecutive MVP titles for Pitt tennis. She also earned the 2008-09 Big East/Aeropostale Institutional Scholar-Athlete of the Year Award and was a three-time member of the Big East Academic All-Star Team. She was named Pitt’s 2009 Blue-Gold Award recipient and has her name etched on the University of Pittsburgh Varsity Walk and graduated with a degree in psychology in 2009.

=== 2006-2007 season ===
==== Results of fall tournaments ====
No.	Date	Tournament	Opponent	Opponent's School	Score
1.	September 8, 2006	CMU Invitational	Kravits	Robert Morris	W, 6-0, 6-0
2.	September 8, 2006	CMU Invitational	Hughes	Duquesne University	W, 6-4, 6-0
3.	September 9, 2006	CMU Invitational	Leah Friedman	University of Pittsburgh	W, 6-2, 6-1
4.	September 15, 2006	Women's E. Collegiate	Rissolo	Providence College	W, 6-0, 6-2
5.	September 15, 2006	Women's E. Collegiate	Flach	United States Military Academy	W, 6-1, 6-2
6.	September 16, 2006	Women's E. Collegiate	Ames	Brown University	L, 3-6, 4-6
7.	September 17, 2006	Women's E. Collegiate	Beehlea	United States Military Academy	W, 6-2, 6-2
8.	September 23, 2006	YSU Invitational	Day	Youngstown State University	W, 6-1, 6-1
9.	September 23, 2006	YSU Invitational	Wodzinski	Toledo	W, 3-6, 6-2, (10-5)
10.	September 24, 2006	YSU Invitational	Cueva	Toledo	W, 6-4, 6-2
11.	October 6, 2006	Matha Thorn Invitational	Kali Delorie	Robert Morris University	W, 6-1, 6-0
12.	October 7, 2006	Martha Thorn Invitational	Kelly Walsh	WVU	L, 4-6, 6-7, (7-4)
13.	October 8, 2006	Martha Thorn Invitational	Williamson	Villanova	W, 6-3, 6-3
14.	October 13, 2006	Hampton Roads Invitational	Santos	Old Dominion	W, 6-4, 6-4
15.	October 14, 2006	Hampton Roads Invitational	Kaslelaniac	William & Mary	L, 3-6, 0-6
16.	October 21, 2006	ITA Championships	Mayer	Siena	W, 6-1, 7-5
17.	October 22, 2006	ITA Championships	Schmidt	Marshall University	L, 3-6, 2-6

=== Coaches ===
- 1990–present: Barry Borza, father
- 2001-2005: Riley Baker, high school
- 2005-2009: George Dieffenbach, Pitt head coach
- 2005-2009: Scott Nagle, Pitt assistant coach
- 2005-2009: Nikki Borza, sister and Pitt volunteer assistant coach

=== Coaching career ===
Borza was announced as an assistant coach of the University of Pittsburgh tennis team by head coach George Dieffenbach on November 24, 2010.

== See also ==
- University of Pittsburgh
- Tennis
