= Korea Elevator Safety Institute =

The Korea Elevator Safety Institute (KESI), an affiliated public organization of the Korean Ministry of Public Administration and Security, was established in 1992 to secure elevator safety. Especially the institute ensures elevator safety by legal inspections and activities such as education, public relations, examinations, publishing, research and international cooperation under the government's Elevator Safety Act.

Also, diagnosis, supervision and consulting of elevators and mechanical parking system are major tasks. A comprehensive Information system is operated to utilize information effectively for safety management of elevators and escalators. Its main office is located in Seoul, Korea.

In 2016, the agency was renamed the Korea Elevator Safety Agency. Currently, the headquarters is located in Jinju, Gyeongsangnam-do, and the work has not changed much from the past.

Unlike in the past, the added business sector has the authority to grant safety certification to research fields such as elevator leading technology development and to elevators developed by companies. It also shares elevator safety management standards with 15 countries, including Vietnam, Germany, and the Netherlands, contributing to maintaining international safety management standards.
