= Kesi Afalava =

Canadian football player (born 1961)

Profile
- Positions: Defensive tackle, Defensive end

Personal information
- Born: September 26, 1961 (age 65)
- Listed height: 6 ft 4 in (1.93 m)
- Listed weight: 250 lb (113 kg)

Career information
- College: Hawaii

Career history
- 1984: Winnipeg Blue Bombers
- 1984: BC Lions

Kesi K. Afalava (born September 26, 1961) is an American former professional football defensive lineman who played for the Winnipeg Blue Bombers and the BC Lions of the Canadian Football League. During the 1984 season, Afalava played in two games for the Blue Bombers and one game for the Lions. He played college football at Hawaii.
