= Gmina Gzy =

Gmina Gzy Gzy Commune
- Gmina
- Location within Poland
- Coordinates (Gzy): 52°45′N 20°57′E
- Country: Poland
- Voivodeship: Masovian
- County: Pułtusk
- Seat: Gzy

Area
  - Total: 104.44 km^{2} (40.32 sq mi)

Population (2011)
  - Total: 3,950
  - Density: 37.8/km^{2} (98.0/sq mi)

Gmina Gzy is a rural gmina (administrative district) in Pułtusk County, Masovian Voivodeship, in east-central Poland. Its seat is the village of Gzy, which lies approximately 10 kilometres (6 mi) north-west of Pułtusk and 56 km (35 mi) north of Warsaw.

The gmina covers an area of 104.44 square kilometres (40.3 sq mi), and as of 2006 its total population is 4,068 (3,950 in 2011).

Gmina Gzy contains the villages and settlements of Begno, Borza-Przechy, Borza-Strumiany, Dębiny, Gotardy, Grochy-Imbrzyki, Grochy-Krupy, Grochy-Serwatki, Gzy, Gzy-Wisnowa, Kałęczyn, Kęsy-Pańki, Ostaszewo-Włuski, Pękowo, Porzowo, Przewodowo Poduchowne, Przewodowo-Majorat, Przewodowo-Parcele, Sisice, Skaszewo Włościańskie, Słończewo, Stare Grochy, Sulnikowo, Szyszki Włościańskie, Szyszki-Folwark, Tąsewy, Wójty-Trojany, Wysocki, Zalesie-Grzymały, Zalesie-Lenki, Zalesie-Pacuszki, Żebry-Falbogi, Żebry-Wiatraki, Żebry-Włosty and Żeromin Drugi.

== Neighbouring gminas ==
Gmina Gzy is bordered by the gminas of Gołymin-Ośrodek, Karniewo, Pułtusk, Sońsk, Świercze and Winnica.
