= Pułtusk County =

Pułtusk County Powiat pułtuski
- County
- Flag Coat of arms

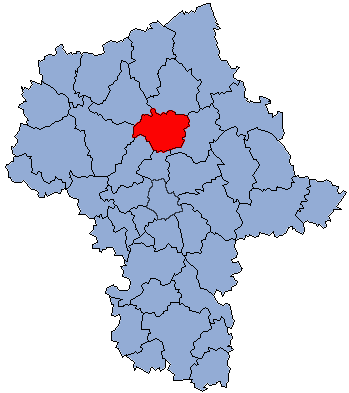
- Location within the voivodeship

- Division into gminas
- Coordinates (Pułtusk): 52°42′N 21°5′E
- Country: Poland
- Voivodeship: Masovian
- Seat: Pułtusk
- Gminas: Total 7: Gmina Gzy; Gmina Obryte; Gmina Pokrzywnica; Gmina Pułtusk; Gmina Świercze; Gmina Winnica; Gmina Zatory

Area
  - Total: 828.63 km^{2} (319.94 sq mi)

Population (2019)
  - Total: 51,862
  - Density: 62.588/km^{2} (162.10/sq mi)
  - Urban: 19,432
  - Rural: 32,430
- Car plates: WPU
- Website: starostwopultusk.org.pl

Pułtusk County (Polish: powiat pułtuski) is a unit of territorial administration and local government (powiat) in Masovian Voivodeship, east-central Poland. It came into being on 1 January 1999 as a result of the Polish local government reforms passed in 1998. Its administrative seat and only town is Pułtusk, which lies 54 kilometres (34 mi) north of Warsaw.

The county covers an area of 828.63 square kilometres (319.9 sq mi). As of 2019 its total population is 51,862, out of which the population of Pułtusk is 19,432 and the rural population is 32,430.

== Neighbouring counties ==
Pułtusk County is bordered by Maków County to the north, Wyszków County to the east, Legionowo County to the south, Nowy Dwór County to the south-west, and Płońsk County and Ciechanów County to the west.

== Administrative divisions ==
The county is subdivided into seven gminas (one urban-rural and six rural). These are listed in the following table, in descending order of population.

Gmina	Type	Area (km^{2})	Population (2019)	Seat
Gmina Pułtusk	urban-rural	133.7	24,659	Pułtusk
Gmina Pokrzywnica	rural	121.0	5,013	Pokrzywnica
Gmina Zatory	rural	121.6	4,851	Zatory
Gmina Obryte	rural	139.7	4,829	Obryte
Gmina Świercze	rural	93.0	4,617	Świercze
Gmina Winnica	rural	115.1	4,096	Winnica
Gmina Gzy	rural	104.4	3,797	Gzy
