= Jadwigów, Włoszczowa County =

Jadwigów
- Village
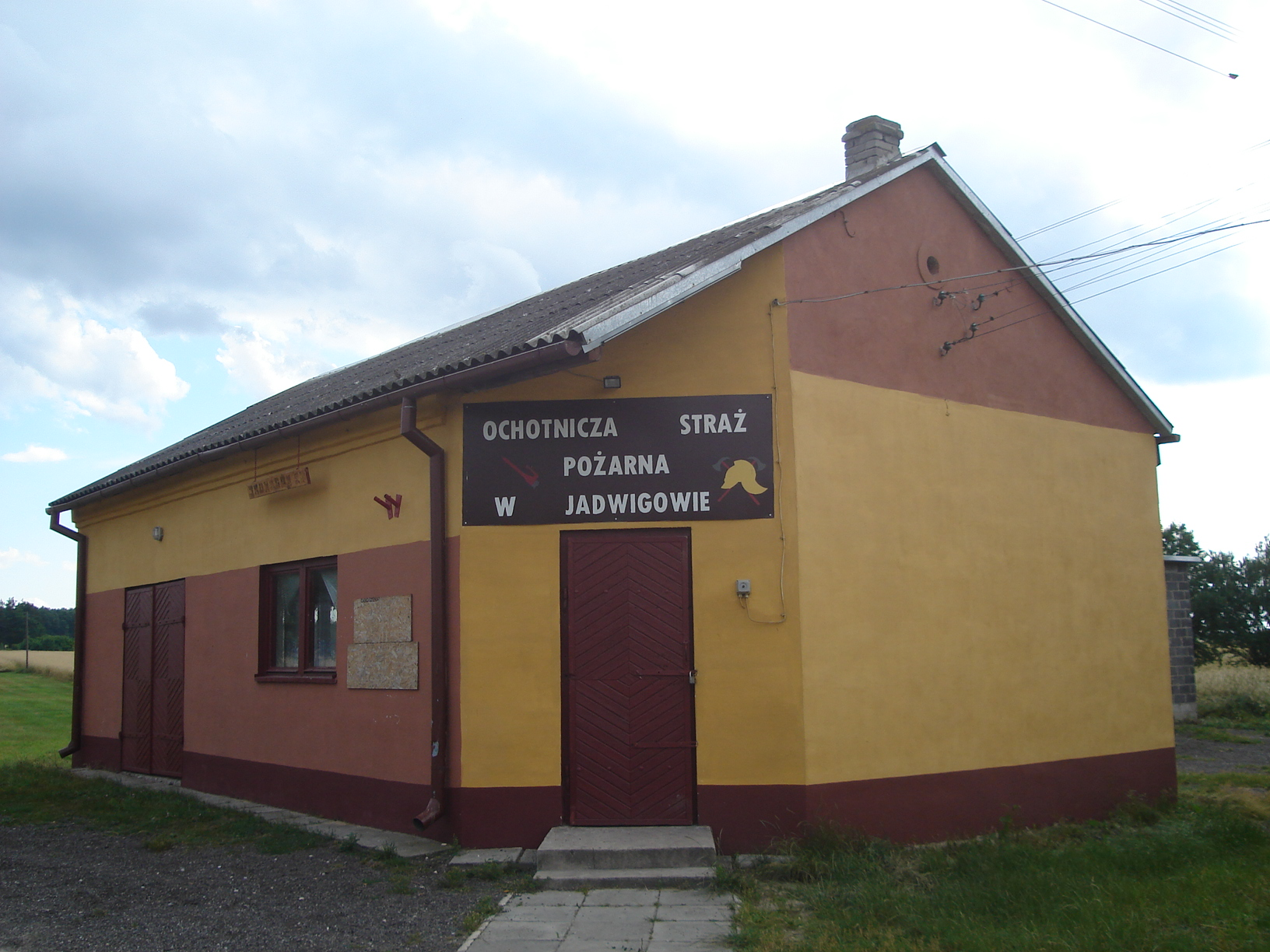

- Location within Poland
- Coordinates: 50°38′N 20°1′E
- Country: Poland
- Voivodeship: Świętokrzyskie
- County: Włoszczowa
- Gmina: Moskorzew
- Population: 133

Jadwigów [jadˈviɡuf] is a village in the administrative district of Gmina Moskorzew, within Włoszczowa County, Świętokrzyskie Voivodeship, in south-central Poland. It lies approximately 7 km (4 mi) south-east of Moskorzew, 25 km (16 mi) south of Włoszczowa, and 51 km (32 mi) south-west of the regional capital Kielce.
