= Adam Idźkowski =

Polish architect (1799–1879)

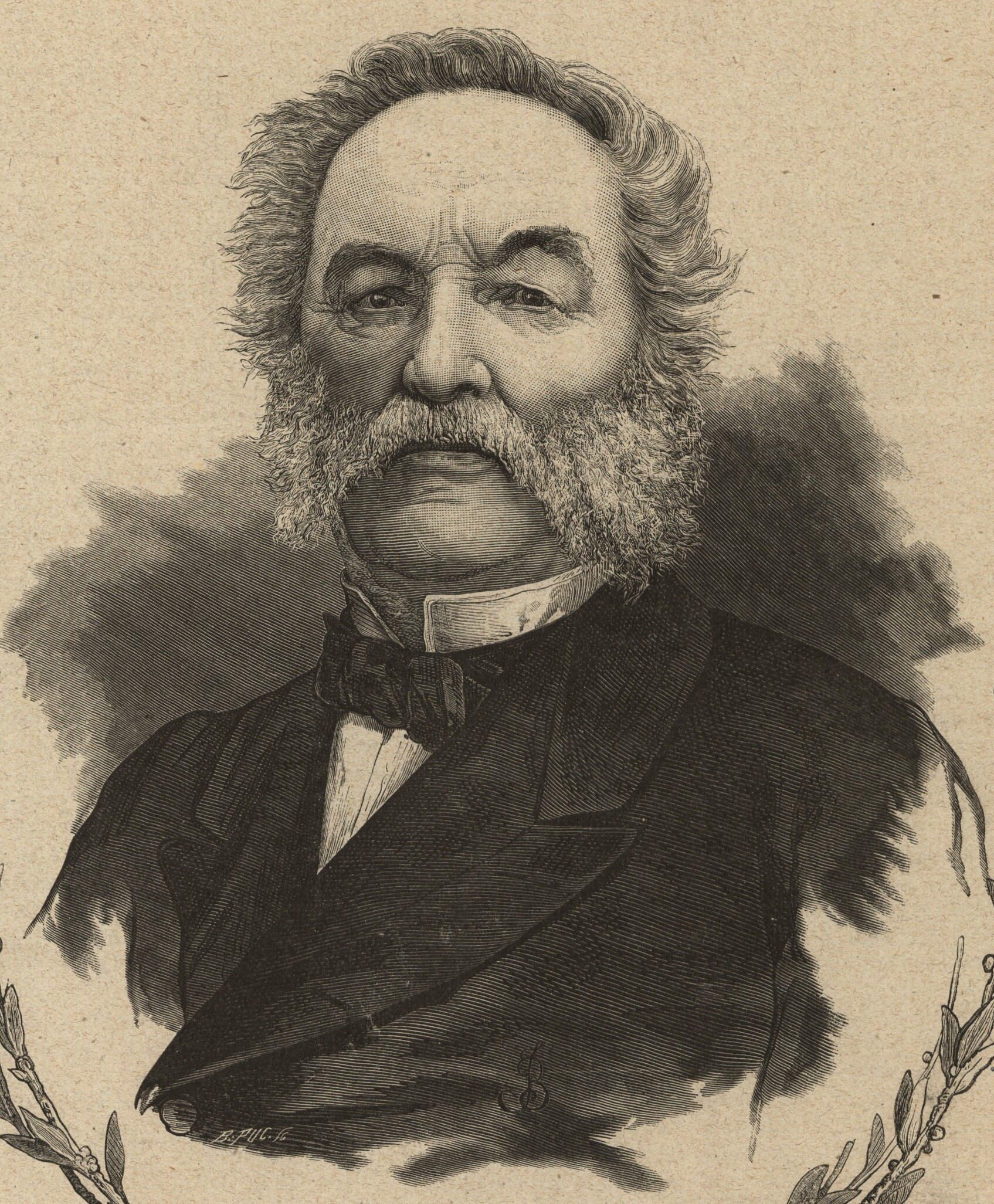
- Born: December 24, 1798; Olszanka
- Died: May 3, 1879; Lityn
- Education: University of Warsaw
- Movement: Eclecticism

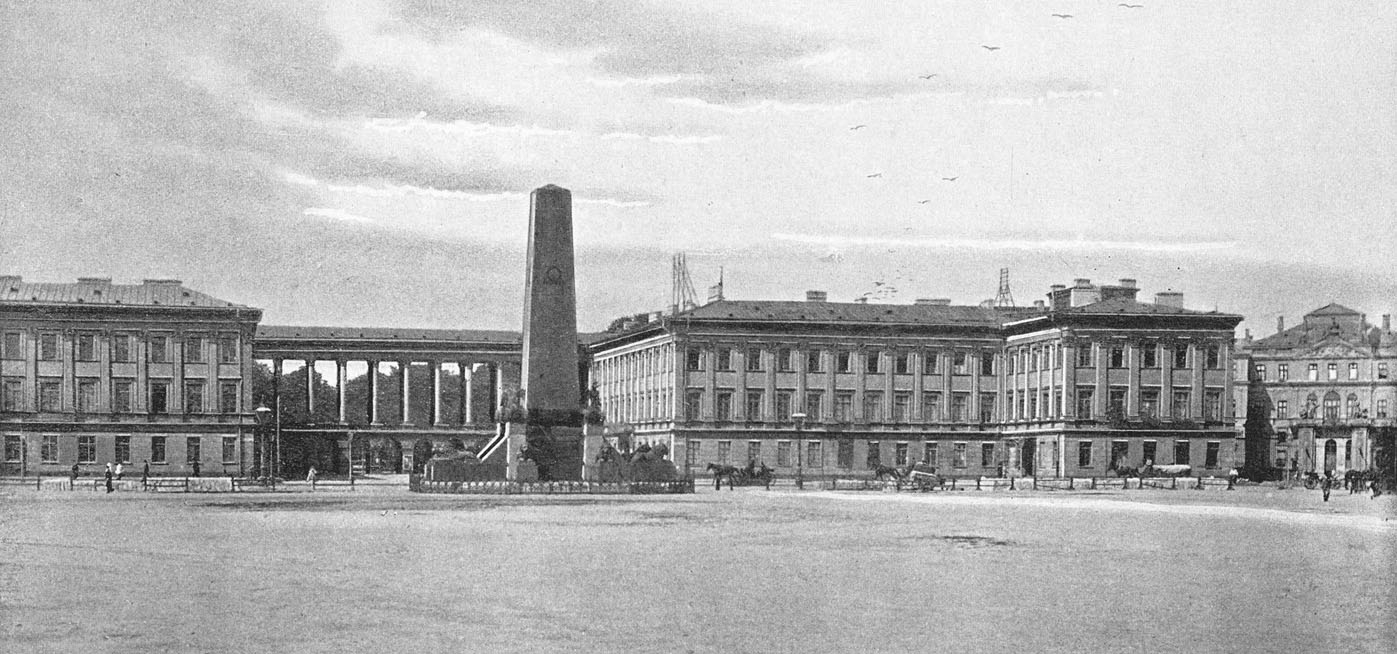
Saxon Palace after reconstruction according to a design by Adam Idźkowski

Adam Idźkowski (24 December 1798 – 3 May 1879) was a Polish architect, civil engineer, inventor, and poet.

== Biography ==
Adam Idźkowski was born into the family of Paweł and Marianna née Zaleski in the village of Olszanka. He graduated from the gymnasium in Pułtusk and then from the Faculty of Fine Arts at the University of Warsaw in 1824.

For the next four years, he traveled through Italy, France, England, and Germany. For the restoration of the Temple of Peace in Rome carried out during that time, he was appointed a member of the Academy of Fine Arts in Florence. He returned to his country in 1827 but did not obtain an academic position, so he focused on construction work. He served, among other roles, as a builder of imperial palaces in the Duchy of Łowicz and as a member of the General Building Council at the Commission of Internal Affairs.

He designed numerous palaces, mainly in Mazovia and Lithuania. He preferred eclectic architecture with a clear fondness for the Gothic style.

In 1829 he presented a project of rebuilding of the neglected Saxon Palace in Warsaw with an open access to the Saxon Garden. The competition for the reconstruction of the palace, announced in 1836, was ultimately won by the design of Wacław Ritschel. However, due to Idźkowski’s good relations with the Russian authorities and certain irregularities in Ritschel's design, Idźkowski took over the supervision of the construction. It seems, however, that the building completed in 1837–1842 was largely based on Ritschel's design, with Idźkowski introducing only minor corrections.

The building consisted of two symmetrical structures with internal courtyards, connected by an impressive colonnade that formed an open passage between the square and the garden. From the side of the square, the building featured a neoclassical façade, while from the garden side it had a Neo-Gothic one, which was removed during renovations in the 1920s.

Other Idźkowski's project include Glinka Palace in Szczawin (c. 1830), the rebuilding of St. John's Cathedral in the English Gothic style (1836–1840), railway station in Skierniewice, St. Lazarus Hospital, Sołtan Palace in Trylesin (1847), remodelling of the palace in Olszewice (1850–1851) and of the Gomel Palace.

Idźkowski was also a theorist of architecture. He published books and articles on the subject; his most important work was Plans of Buildings, covering various types of houses, rural residences of different sizes, churches, public buildings, bridges, gardens, monuments, and similar elements in a variety of architectural styles. They were issued in installments and contained excellently drawn designs. They were published in Polish, French, and Russian. For this work, the Imperial Academy of Arts in St. Petersburg appointed him as a member.

He authored works on technology and art, including Design of a road under the Vistula River connecting Warsaw with Praga (1828). It was a utopian project to construct a tunnel in Warsaw beneath the bed of the Vistula River. Idźkowski also proposed a design for a “water-land route” as well as a monorail with carriages suspended on both sides. All of these projects passed without much notice.

Idźkowski was also engaged in invention; he developed astronomical clocks, a design for a “calculating machine,” a piano with extended strings, and others. He also pursued poetry—in 1857, under the pseudonym Adam Pellegrino, he published the work Temple of Peace.

He died in Lityn in Podolia on 3 May 1879.

== Commemoration ==
- In 1928, a street in the Solec district of Warsaw was named after Adam Idźkowski.

== Bibliography ==
- Migasiewicz, Paweł (2024). "„Ieden z najpyszniejszych widoków Warszawy". O francuskich wzorcach arkad i kolumnady Pałacu Saskiego". Biuletyn Historii Sztuki. 86 (1).
