= Chebdzie =

- Village
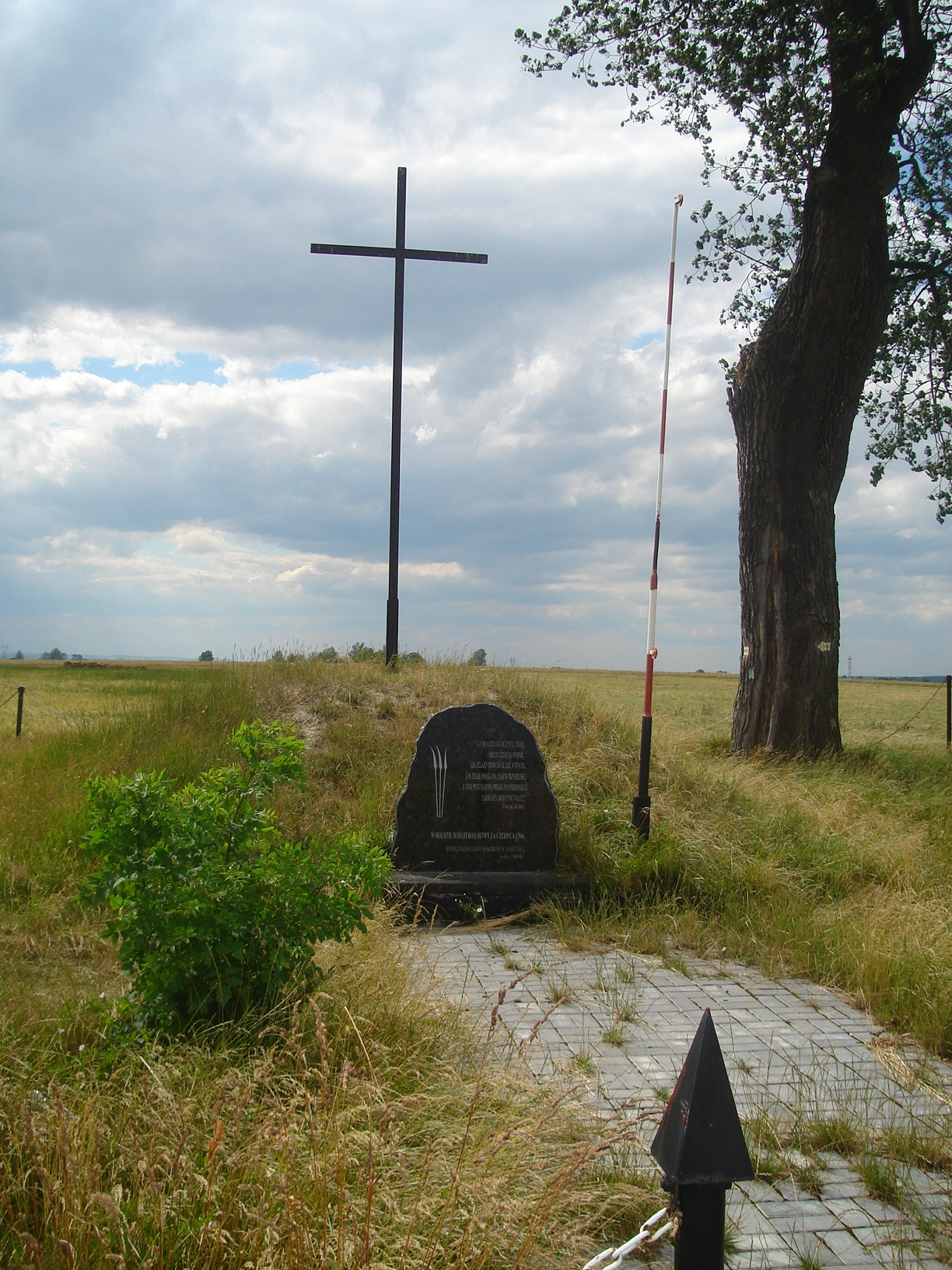

- Location within Poland
- Coordinates: 50°38′N 19°57′E
- Country: Poland
- Voivodeship: Świętokrzyskie
- County: Włoszczowa
- Gmina: Moskorzew
- Population: 169

Chebdzie [ˈxɛbd͡ʑɛ] is a village in the administrative district of Gmina Moskorzew, within Włoszczowa County, Świętokrzyskie Voivodeship, in south-central Poland. It lies approximately 4 km (2 mi) south of Moskorzew, 25 km (16 mi) south of Włoszczowa, and 55 km (34 mi) south-west of the regional capital Kielce.
