= Damiany, Świętokrzyskie Voivodeship =

Damiany
- Village
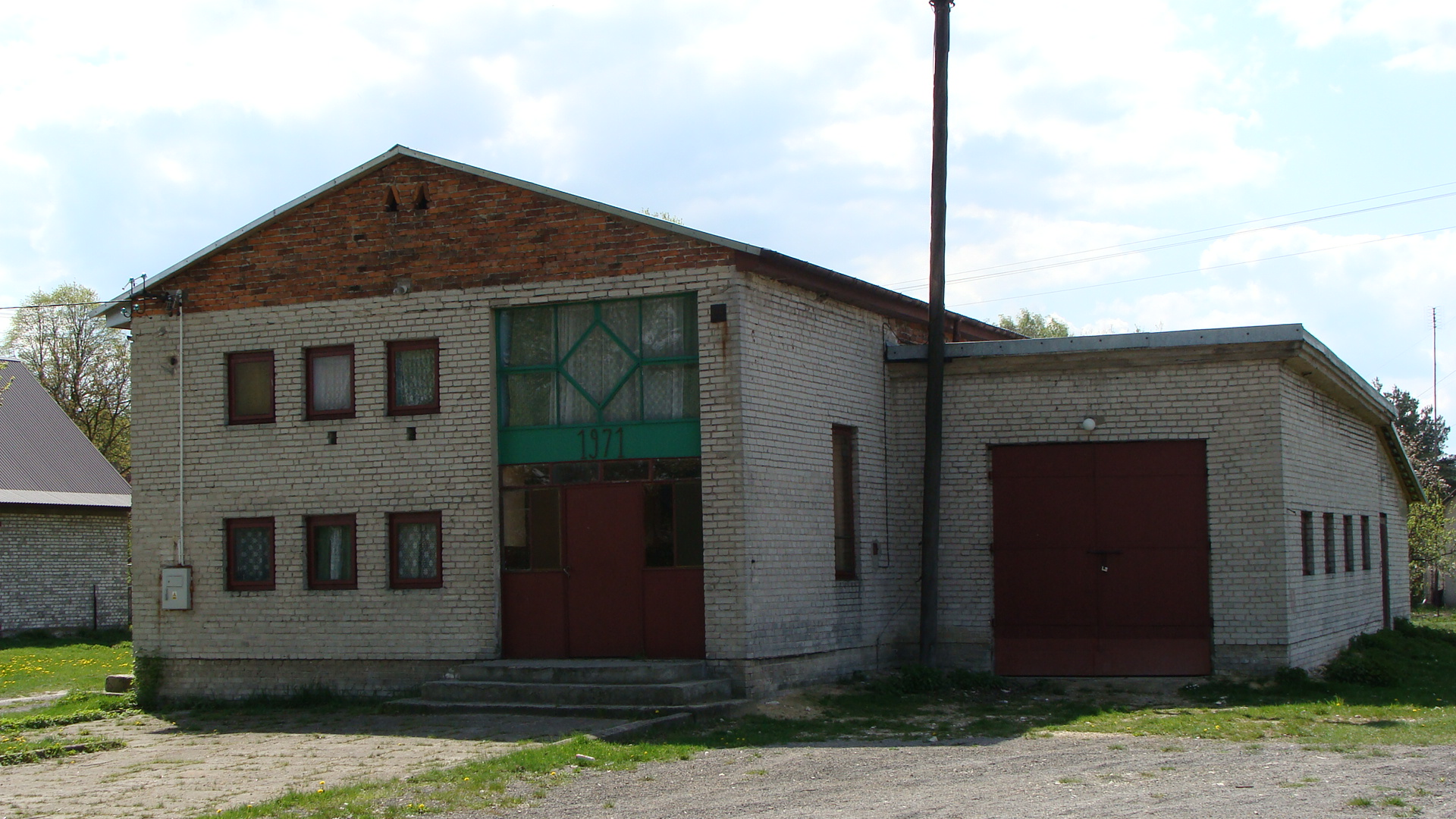

- Location within Poland
- Coordinates: 50°39′N 19°58′E
- Country: Poland
- Voivodeship: Świętokrzyskie
- County: Włoszczowa
- Gmina: Moskorzew
- Population: 167

Damiany [daˈmjanɨ] is a village in the administrative district of Gmina Moskorzew, within Włoszczowa County, Świętokrzyskie Voivodeship, in south-central Poland. It lies approximately 3 km (2 mi) south-east of Moskorzew, 23 km (14 mi) south of Włoszczowa, and 53 km (33 mi) south-west of the regional capital Kielce.
