= Dalekie =

Dalekie may refer to the following places in Poland:

- Dalekie, Gmina Granowo, Grodzisk County in Greater Poland Voivodeship (west-central Poland)
- Dalekie, Poznań County in Greater Poland Voivodeship (west-central Poland)
- Dalekie, Gmina Wąsewo, Ostrów County in Masovian Voivodeship (east-central Poland)
- Dalekie, Wyszków County in Masovian Voivodeship (east-central Poland)
- Dalekie, Świętokrzyskie Voivodeship (south-central Poland)
- Dalekie, Pomeranian Voivodeship (north Poland)
