= Przybyszów, Świętokrzyskie Voivodeship =

Przybyszów
- Village
- Location within Poland
- Coordinates: 50°38′N 19°55′E
- Country: Poland
- Voivodeship: Świętokrzyskie
- County: Włoszczowa
- Gmina: Moskorzew
- Population: 155

Przybyszów [pʂɨˈbɨʂuf] is a village in the administrative district of Gmina Moskorzew, within Włoszczowa County, Świętokrzyskie Voivodeship, in south-central Poland. It lies approximately 4 km (2 mi) south-west of Moskorzew, 25 km (16 mi) south of Włoszczowa, and 57 km (35 mi) south-west of the regional capital Kielce.
