= August Kowalczyk =

Polish actor, activist and Holocaust survivor (1921–2012)

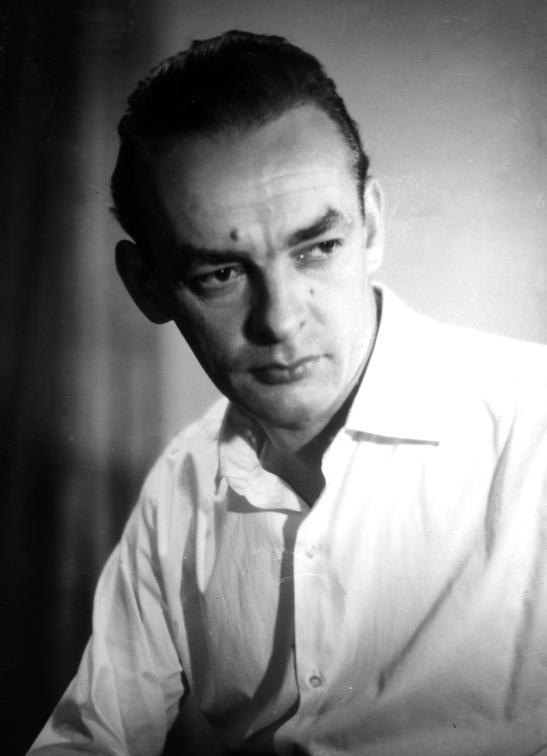
- August Kowalczyk.
- Born: 15 August 1921; Tarnawa Góra, Second Polish Republic
- Died: 29 July 2012 (aged 90); Oświęcim, Poland
- Occupations: Actor; Film director; Television director; Theatre director

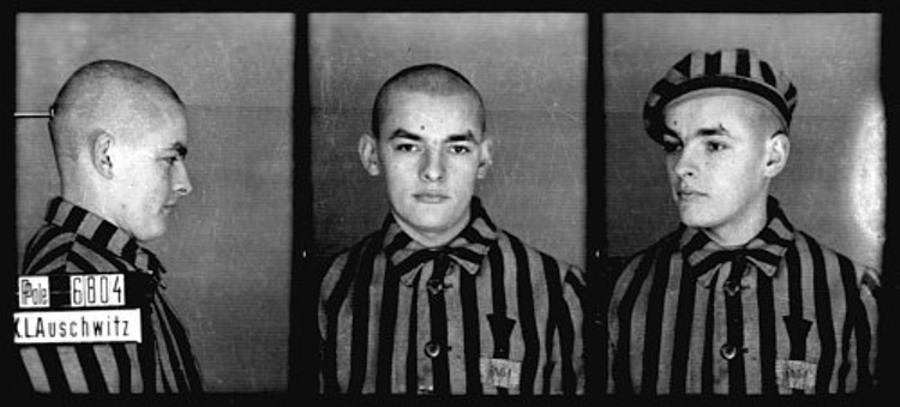
August Kowalczyk as KL-Auschwitz prisoner, KL Number 6804, 1940

August Marian Kowalczyk (15 August 1921 – 29 July 2012) was a Polish actor, theatre, television and film director who was the last survivor of a breakout of prisoners from Auschwitz Concentration Camp on 10 June 1942.

Born in Tarnawa Góra, he was arrested on 4 December 1940 whilst trying to cross the border with Czechoslovakia to join the Polish Army in France and was then sent to Auschwitz where he laboured for I.G.Farben. After escaping from the camp with 9 other prisoners (13 died and 20 were recaptured), he hid in the forest and was sheltered in the attic of a house for 7 weeks in the village of Bojszowy. He then travelled under false documents to Silesia and Kraków, before becoming a soldier in the Armia Krajowa, which was the main resistance movement in Poland.

On 9 November 1945 he made his debut as a stage actor in Kraków, performing with the Polish Theatre from Warsaw. He died of cancer, at age 90, on 29 July 2012 in Oświęcim, in a hospice he founded.

He was married four times. He has two children, son Marek (born 1950), from his first marriage and son Marcin (born 1957), from his second marriage.
