= Chlewice, Świętokrzyskie Voivodeship =

Chlewice
- Village
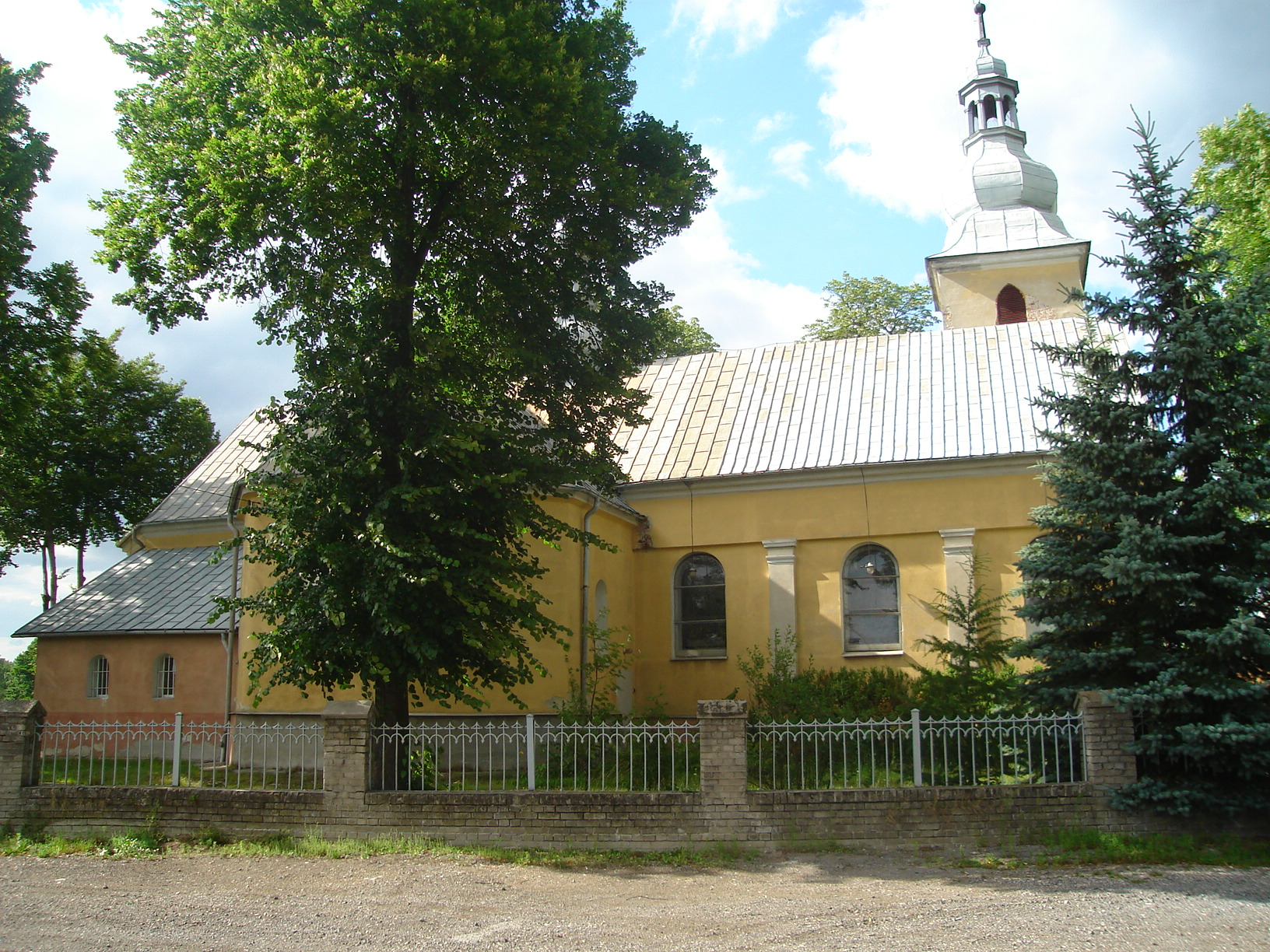
- Chlewice church

- Location within Poland
- Coordinates: 50°39′N 20°0′E
- Country: Poland
- Voivodeship: Świętokrzyskie
- County: Włoszczowa
- Gmina: Moskorzew
- Population: 759

Chlewice [xlɛˈvit͡sɛ] is a village in the administrative district of Gmina Moskorzew, within Włoszczowa County, Świętokrzyskie Voivodeship, in south-central Poland. It lies approximately 5 km (3 mi) east of Moskorzew, 23 km (14 mi) south of Włoszczowa, and 51 km (32 mi) south-west of the regional capital Kielce.
