= Glinka Palace in Szczawin =

- Pałac Glinków w Szczawinie
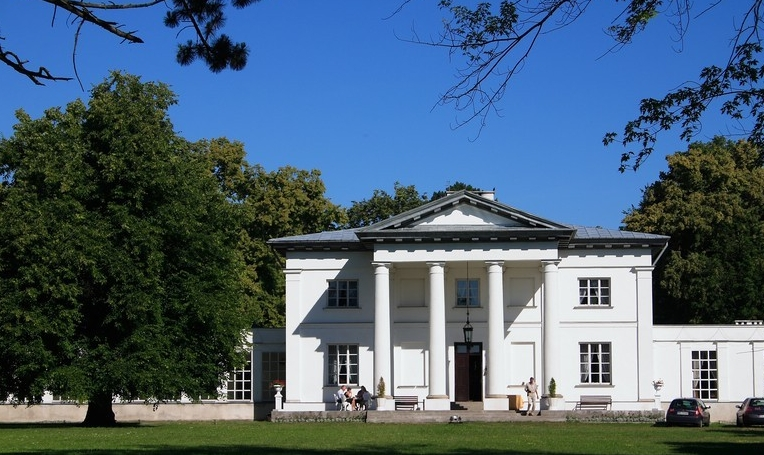

General information
- Location: Szczawin, Poland
- Coordinates: 52.899081°N 21.532867°E

Technical details
- Floor count: 3

Design and construction
- Architect: Adam Idźkowski

Glinka Palace in Szczawin is a Neoclassical palace in Szczawin, Masovian Voivodeship, Poland. It was built around 1830 for Józef Glinka to a design by Adam Idźkowski, inspired by the Renaissance villas of Andrea Palladio. The palace consists of a central building with a Tuscan portico, connected by galleries to two side pavilions, and is surrounded by a landscape park.

The palace remained the residence of the Glinka family until 1939. Following the Second World War, it housed agricultural institutions and a primary school. The building was subsequently restored and converted into a hotel and event venue.

== History ==
The Glinka family acquired the Szczawin estate in the mid-18th century through the marriage of Antoni Glinka to Bogumiła née Mostowska, the widow of the previous owner, Wojciech Kazimierz Przeradowski. Their grandson, Józef Glinka, a councilor of the Płock Voivodeship and justice of the peace in Ostrołęka County, married to Maria née Okęcka, commissioned the construction of the palace from the renowned Warsaw architect Adam Idźkowski.

Idźkowski designed the palace, drawing inspiration from the Renaissance villas of Andrea Palladio, particularly the Villa Badoer in Fratta Polesine and the Villa Emo in Fanzolo. The palace consists of a five-bay main body preceded by a portico with Tuscan columns, connected by four-bay corridor galleries to two three-bay pavilions. A terrace adjoins the main body on the garden side. Idźkowski also designed a large landscape park with irregular ponds, which was later enhanced in 1898 based on a design by Walerian Kronenberg. Within the park stood an old manor, likely wooden, from the 18th or 17th century, which burned down in 1919.

The palace remained in the Glinka family’s possession until 1939. After Józef Glinka, the estate was inherited by Mikołaj Zenon Glinka, married first to Maria Watta-Kosicka and, after her death, to his cousin Maria Augusta Okęcka. The Szczawin estate included the farms of Szczawin, Grodzisk, Ponikiew Wielka, and Czarnów, totaling 7,701 morgs of land. Mikołaj Glinka also owned the Susk Stary estate.

Mikołaj Zenon, who died in 1907, had two sons from his first marriage, Antoni and Władysław Bonifacy, and a son, Zygmunt, from his second marriage. Antoni inherited Szczawin, Władysław Bonifacy received the Susk Stary estate, and Zygmunt inherited Mękarzów. Despite the divisions, the Szczawin estate remained one of the largest in the Łomża Governorate.

Between 1890 and 1894, the palace underwent a thorough renovation, and the park was reorganized in 1898 according to a design by Walerian Kronenberg. In 1918, a second wing was added to the eastern gallery. Antoni Glinka died in 1933, and his son Stanisław inherited the estate. During World War II, the estate was managed by a German named Radke. After the war, it was transformed into a State Agricultural Farm (PGR) and later into a labor cooperative. The palace was subsequently used as a primary school. In 1977, the school was relocated from personally deteriorating palace to nearby Goworowo. In 1998, it became the property of the Sawczuk family from Ostrów Mazowiecka. Despite damage, the palace retains its paneling, built-in wardrobes and sideboards, stucco work, and fireplaces, including a neo-Baroque one from the late 19th century. After renovation, the palace now serves as a hotel and banquet venue.

Remnants of the former farmstead and estate, including a stone and brick granary and a stone barn, both from the early 20th century, remain around the palace. A linden avenue leading to Goworowo runs along the southern park boundary. Near it, at a fork in the road, stands a historic neo-Gothic stone statue of the Immaculate Conception of the Virgin Mary, erected in 1860 in memory of Wiktoria Wyczechowska, who died that year.
