= Chlewska Wola =

- Village
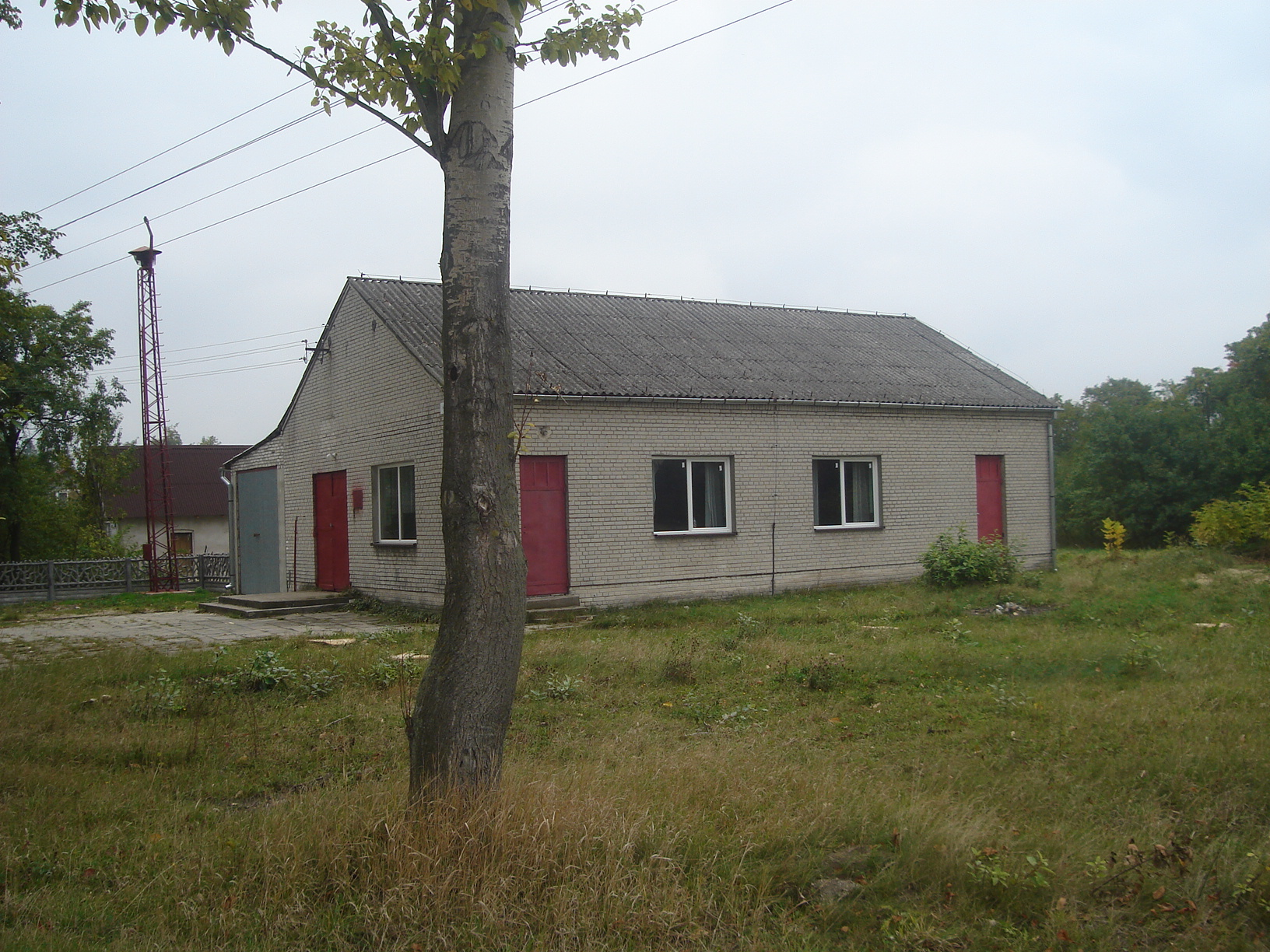

- Location within Poland
- Coordinates: 50°41′N 19°58′E
- Country: Poland
- Voivodeship: Świętokrzyskie
- County: Włoszczowa
- Gmina: Moskorzew
- Population: 284

Chlewska Wola [ˈxlɛfska ˈvɔla] is a village in the administrative district of Gmina Moskorzew, within Włoszczowa County, Świętokrzyskie Voivodeship, in south-central Poland. It lies approximately 3 km (2 mi) north-east of Moskorzew, 19 km (12 mi) south of Włoszczowa, and 51 km (32 mi) south-west of the regional capital Kielce.
