= Loretto, Poland =

Village in Poland

Loretto
- Village
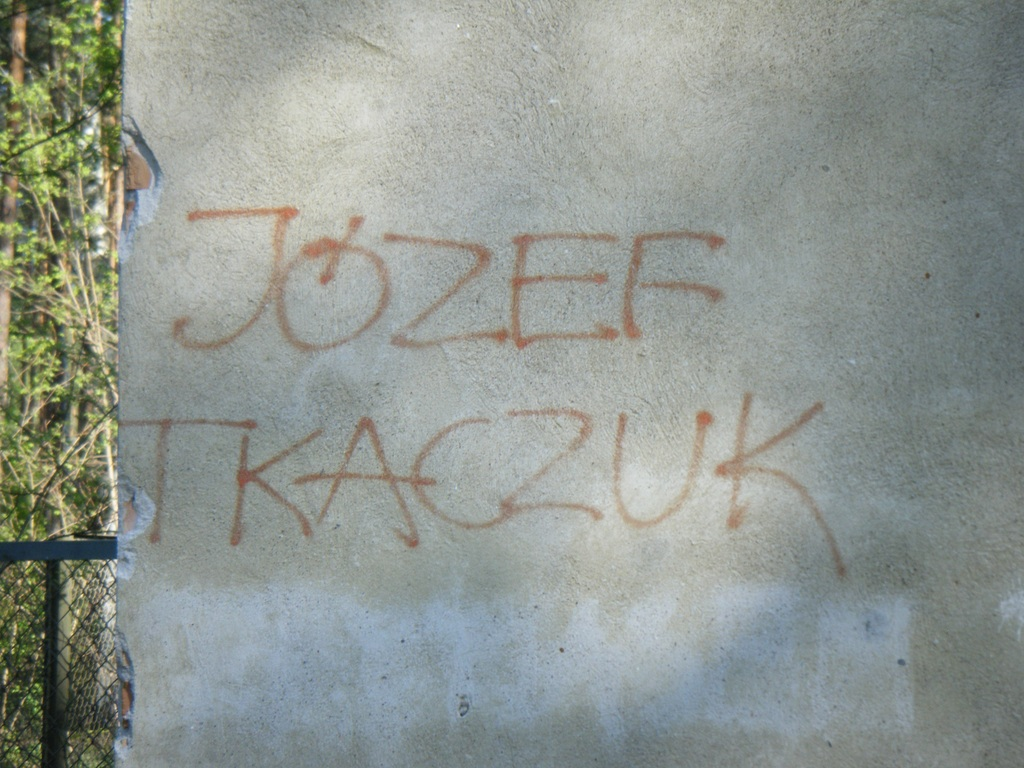
- Józef Tkaczuk written on a wall in the village. Image taken on a FinePix Z33WP, 2012

- Location within Poland
- Coordinates: 52°34′24″N 21°34′55″E
- Country: Poland
- Voivodeship: Masovian
- County: Wyszków
- Gmina: Wyszków
- Postal code: 07-202
- SIMC: 0523360

Loretto is a village in the administrative district of Gmina Wyszków, within Wyszków County, Masovian Voivodeship, in east-central Poland.
