= Tarnawa Góra, Świętokrzyskie Voivodeship =

Tarnawa Góra
- Village
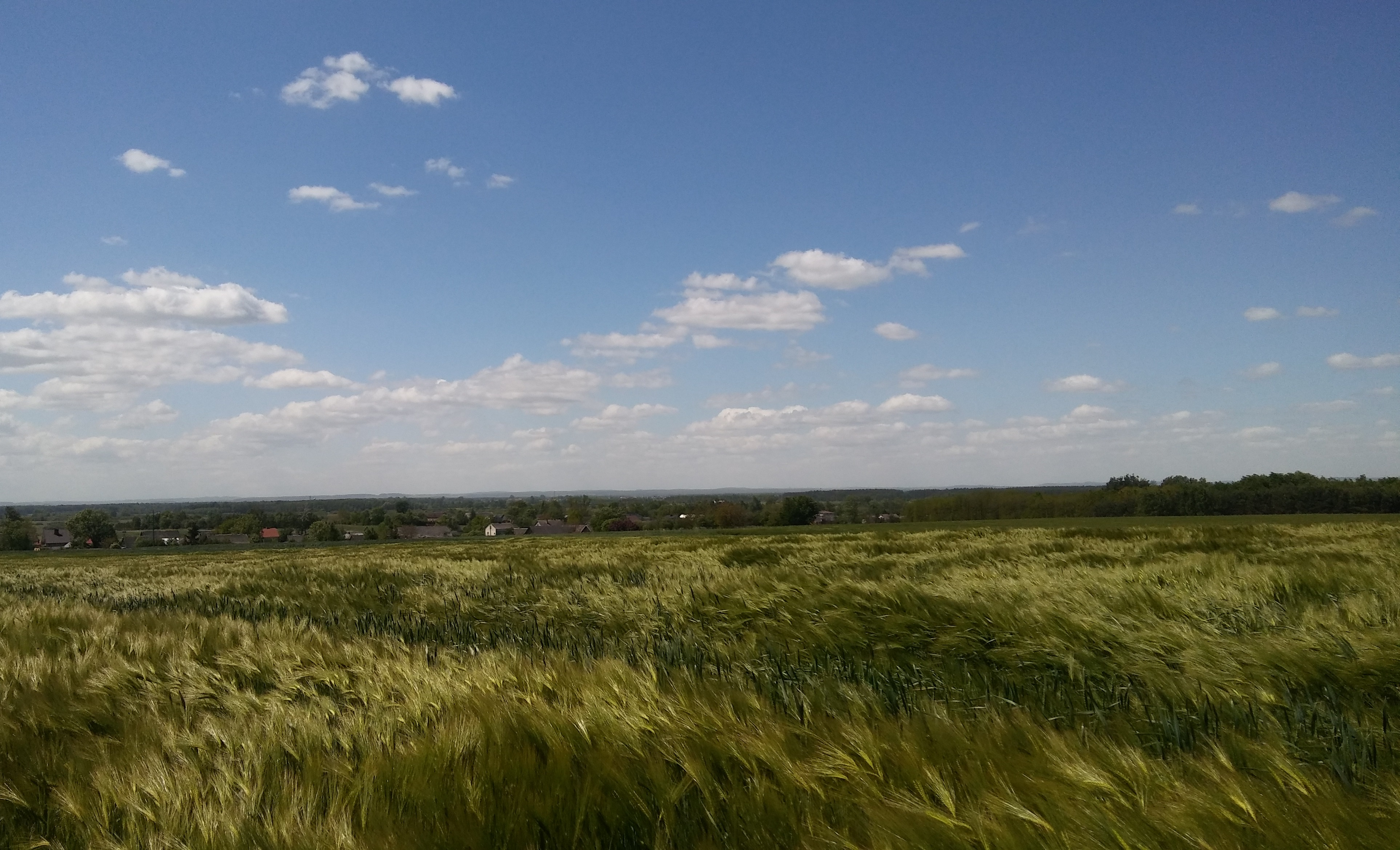

- Location within Poland
- Coordinates: 50°39′N 19°52′E
- Country: Poland
- Voivodeship: Świętokrzyskie
- County: Włoszczowa
- Gmina: Moskorzew
- Population: 290
- Postal code: 29-130
- Area code: +48 34
- Car plates: TLW

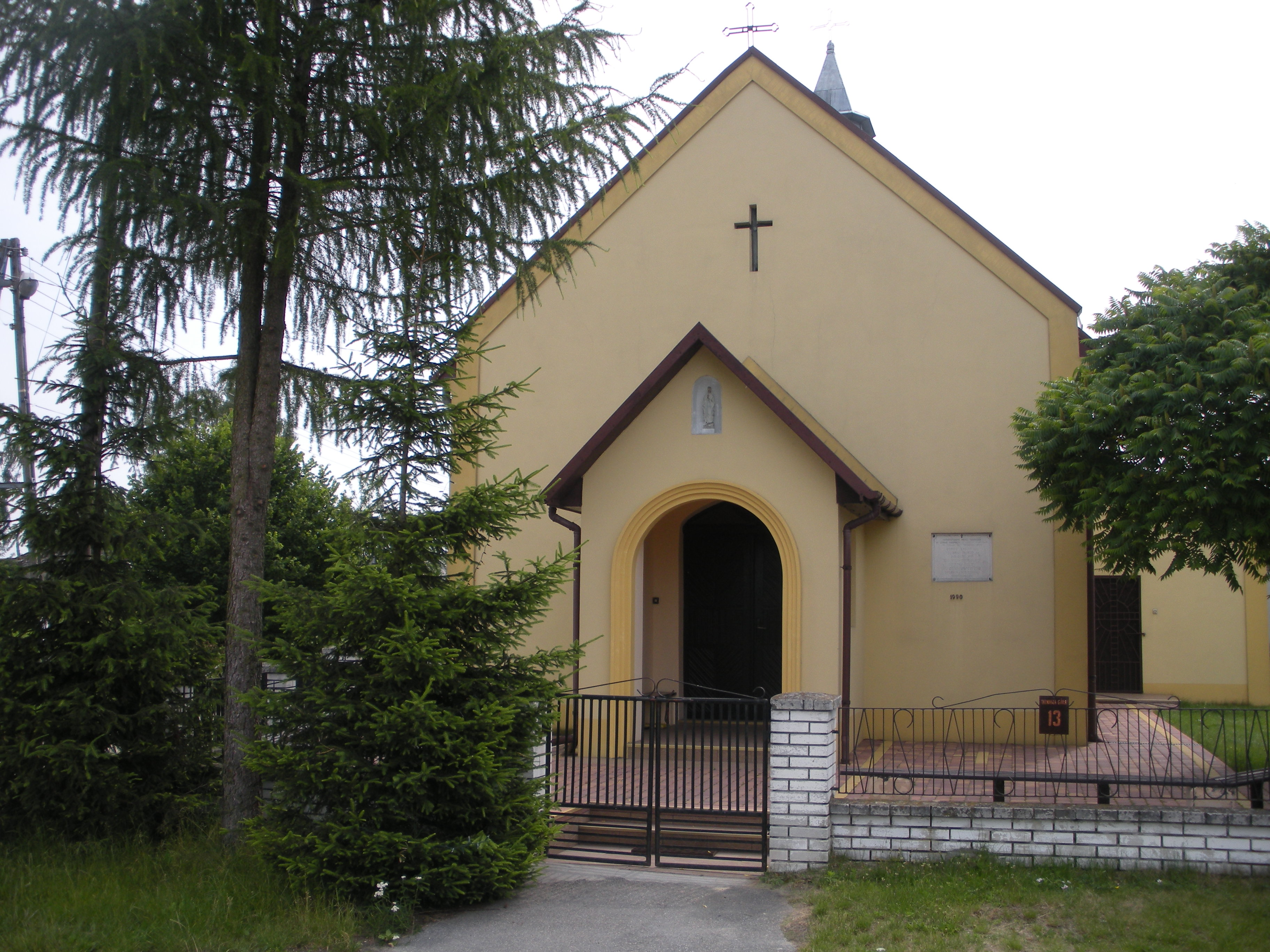
Chapel in Tarnawa Góra

Tarnawa Góra [tarˈnava ˈɡura] is a village in the administrative district of Gmina Moskorzew, within Włoszczowa County, Świętokrzyskie Voivodeship, in south-central Poland. It lies approximately 6 km (4 mi) west of Moskorzew, 24 km (15 mi) south of Włoszczowa, and 59 km (37 mi) south-west of the regional capital Kielce.
