= Drogoszewo, Masovian Voivodeship =

Drogoszewo
- Village
- Location within Poland
- Coordinates: 52°34′17″N 21°26′43″E
- Country: Poland
- Voivodeship: Masovian
- County: Wyszków
- Gmina: Wyszków
- Population: 200

Drogoszewo [drɔɡɔˈʂɛvɔ] is a village in the administrative district of Gmina Wyszków, within Wyszków County, Masovian Voivodeship, in east-central Poland.
