= Marcin Zaleski =

Polish painter

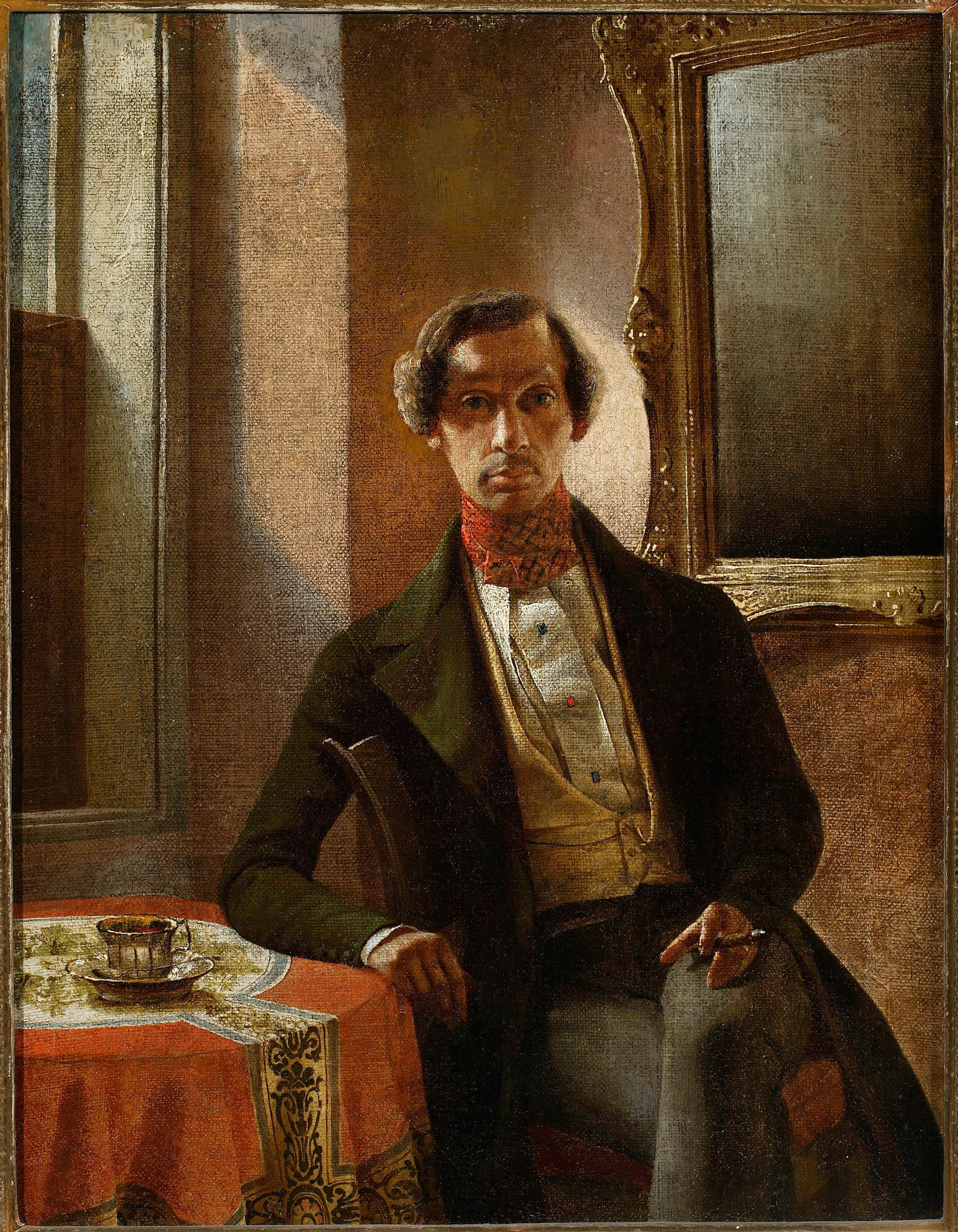
- Marcin Zaleski, Self-Portrait, 1840
- Born: 1796; Kraków, Poland
- Died: 1877 (aged 80–81); Warsaw, Poland
- Known for: Painting

Marcin Zaleski (1796 – 16 September 1877) was a Polish painter, a representative of Neoclassicism, considered the greatest Polish vedutist of the 19th century. He mostly painted the cityscapes of Warsaw, Kraków and Wilno.

== Biography ==
Zaleski was born in Kraków. He received his education in Kraków and Warsaw. In 1817−1822, Zaleski worked as a decorator in a Warsaw theatre while producing copies of paintings. In 1828 the artist exhibited his own work for the first time and received a scholarship to continue his education as a painter. He then continued to study painting in Germany, France and Italy. He was also among the first daguerreotypists in Warsaw. He took first photographs around 1840, though they have not survived to the present day and it remains unknown what exactly they depicted. In 1846 the artist became a professor of perspective at the School of Fine Arts in Warsaw. Zaleski died in Warsaw in 1877 at the age of 80 and was buried the Powązki Cemetery.

== Works ==
Zaleski is particularly well known for works depicting city views and architecture of Warsaw, Kraków and Vilnius. His works can be found at the National Museum in Warsaw, Poland, the Turkey's Adam Mickiewicz Museum and the Gomel Palace, among other locations. Among Zaleski's works is a series of paintings on the November Uprising in Warsaw, to which he was an eyewitness. His paintings, alongside those of Bernardo Bellotto, were used in order to reconstruct historical buildings in Warsaw that were damaged or destroyed during the Second World War.

In 2019, the National Museum in Warsaw regained the oil painting Interior of the Cathedral in Milan by Zaleski, which went missing after the Warsaw Uprising of 1944. It was rediscovered in Vienna in 2018 and brought back to the country thanks to the efforts of the Ministry of Culture and National Heritage of Poland. An official handover ceremony attended by the Minister of Culture Piotr Gliński was held at the museum in order to celebrate the return of the lost artwork.

== Gallery ==
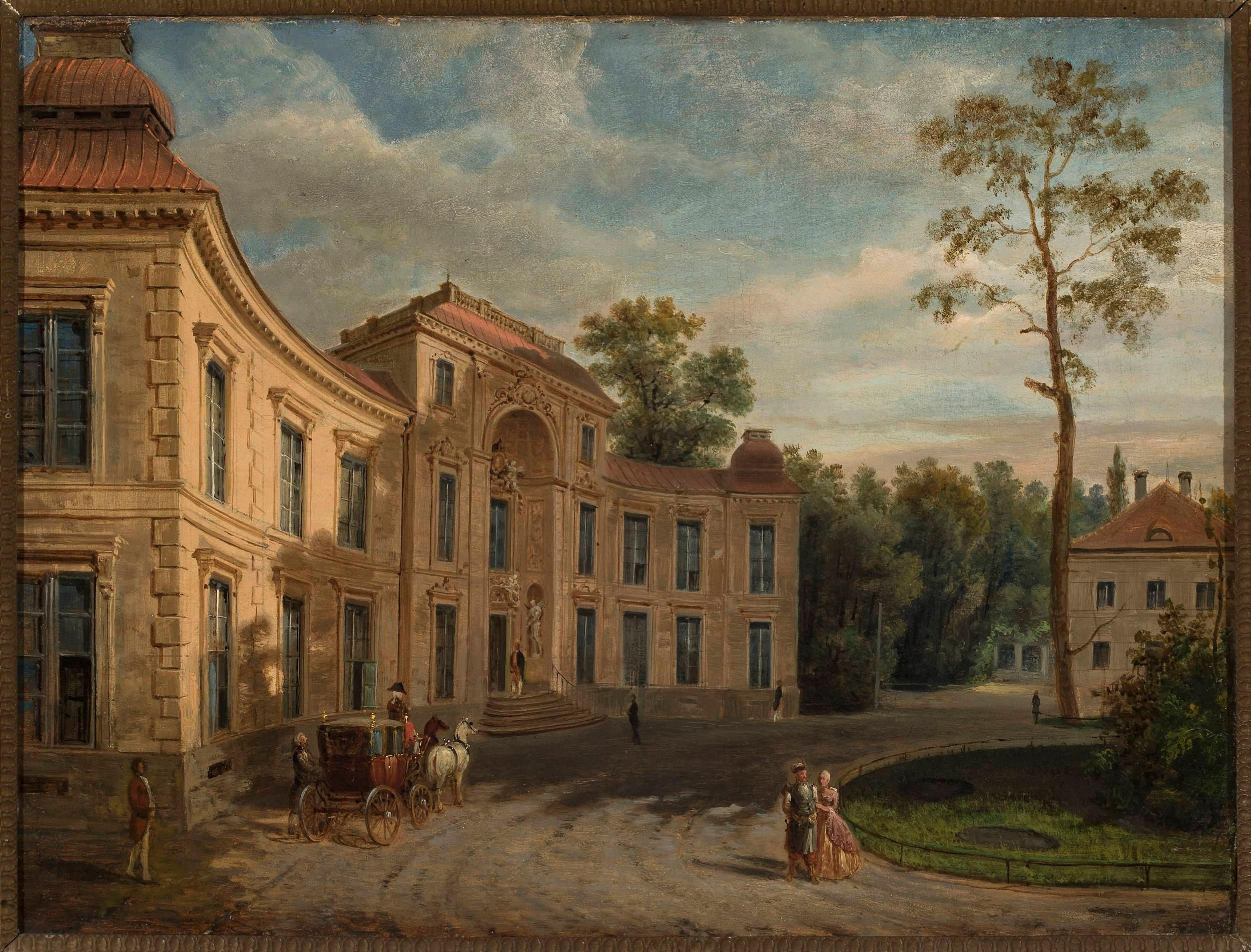
Myślewicki Palace in Łazienki Park, 1870

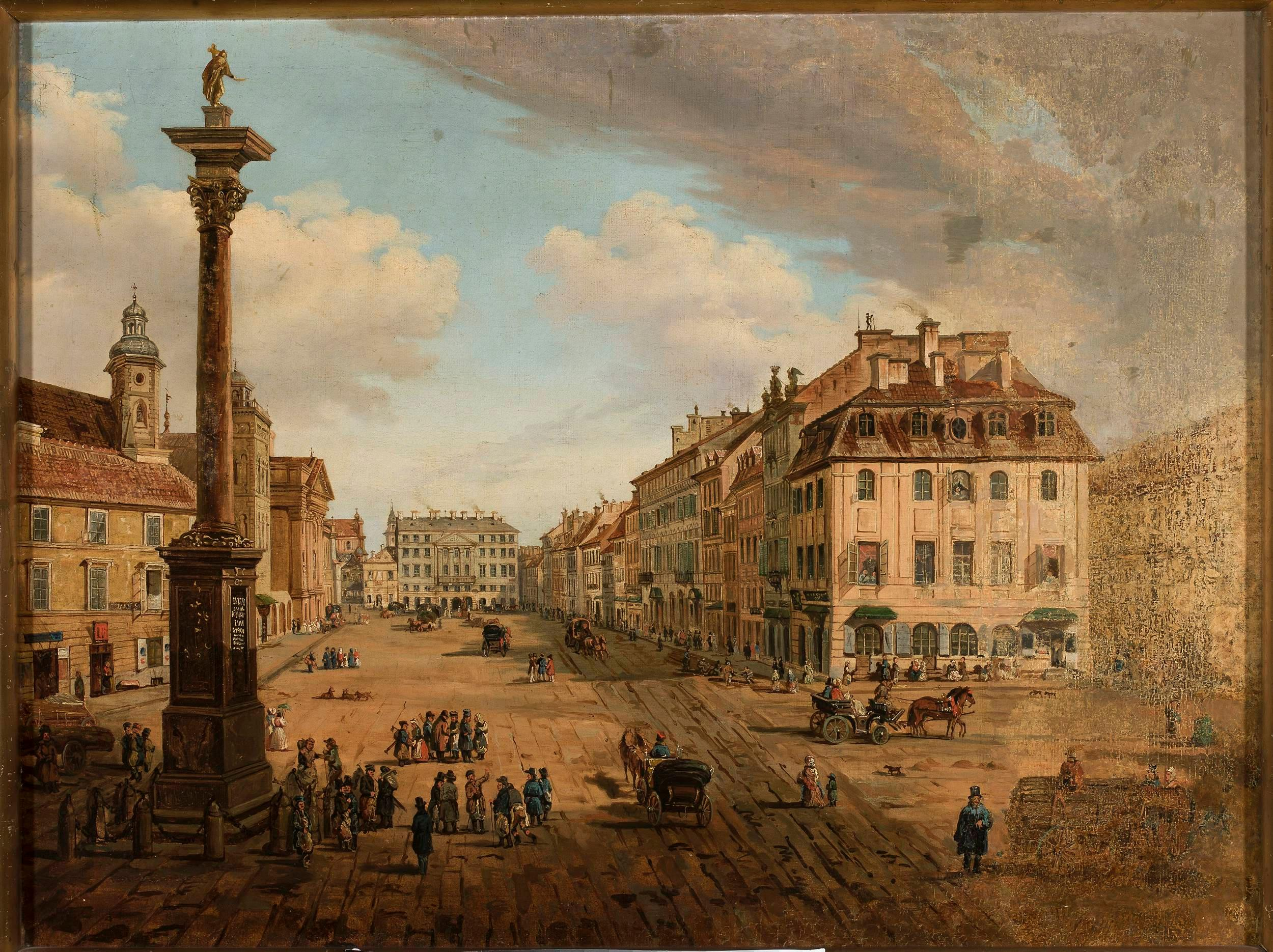
View from Castle Square to Krakowskie Przedmieście, ca. 1838

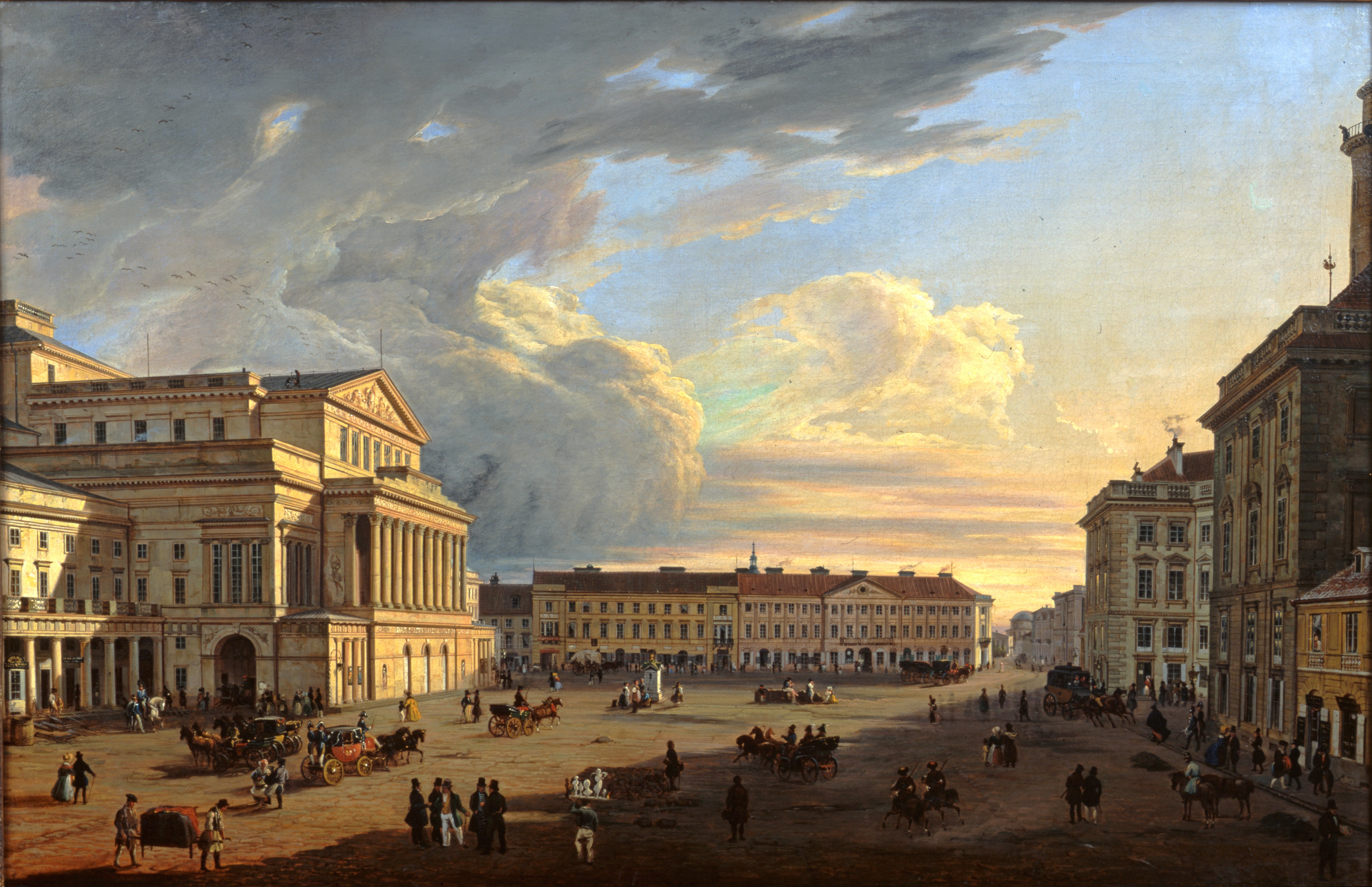
Theatre Square in Warsaw, 1838

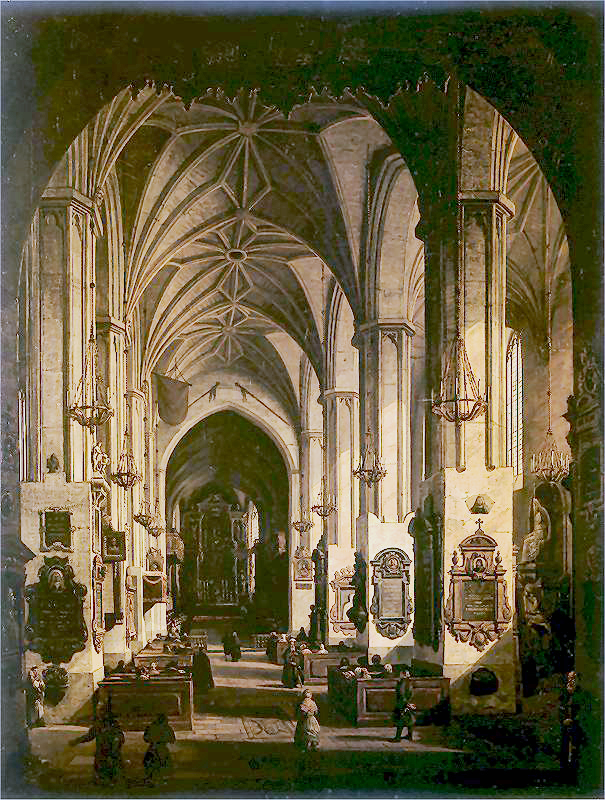
St. John's Cathedral, ca. 1840

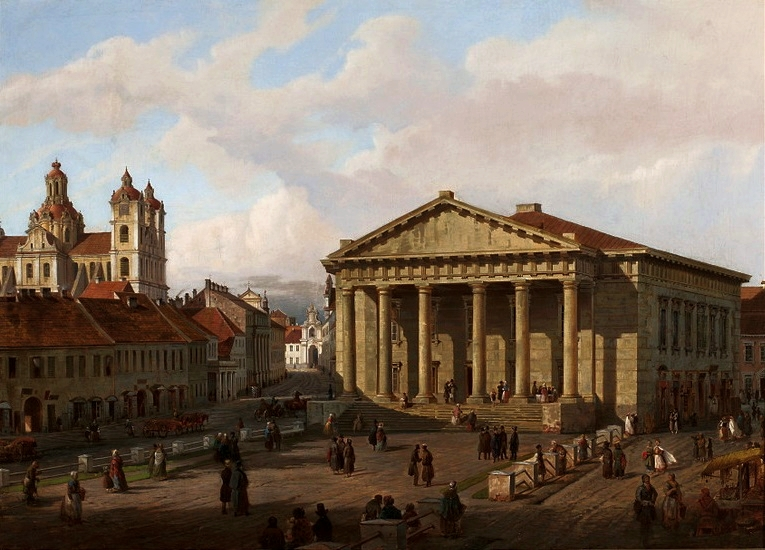
Town Hall in Vilnius, ca. 1846

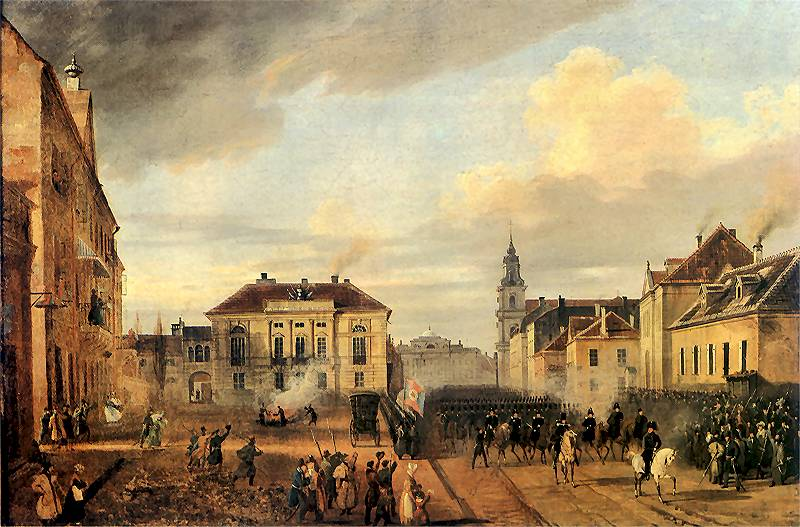
The Return of Squads of Polish Army from Wierzbno, 1831

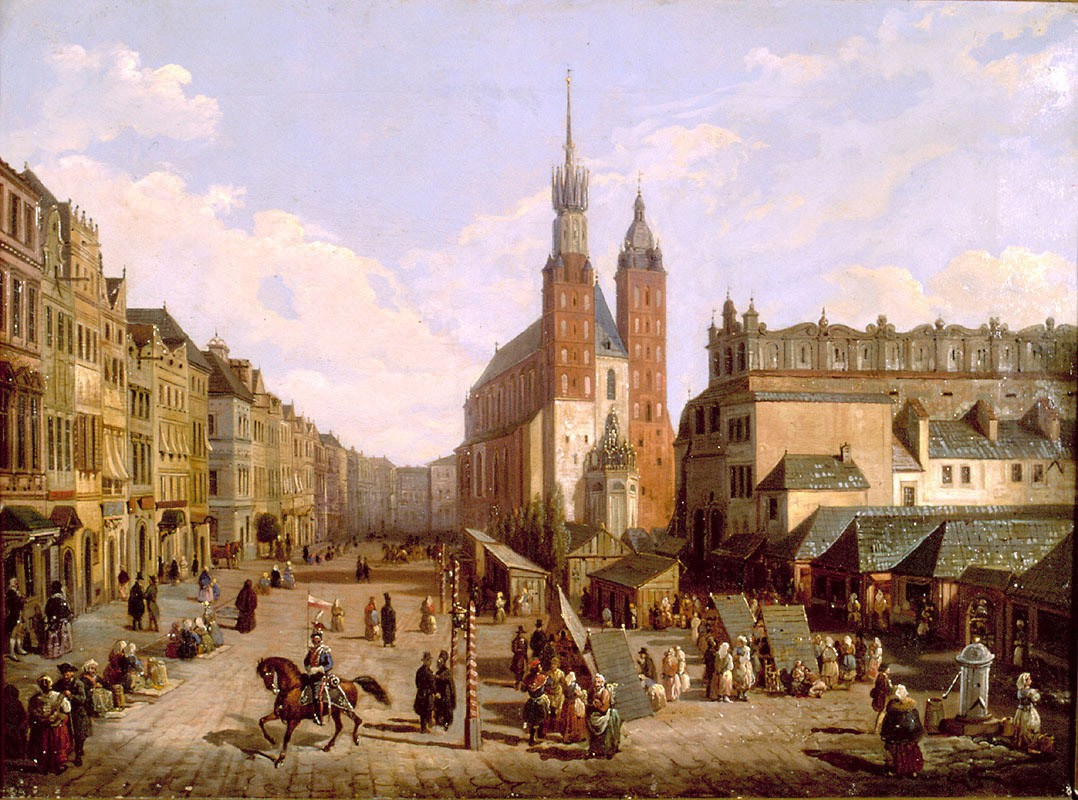
The Market Square in Kraków, 1836

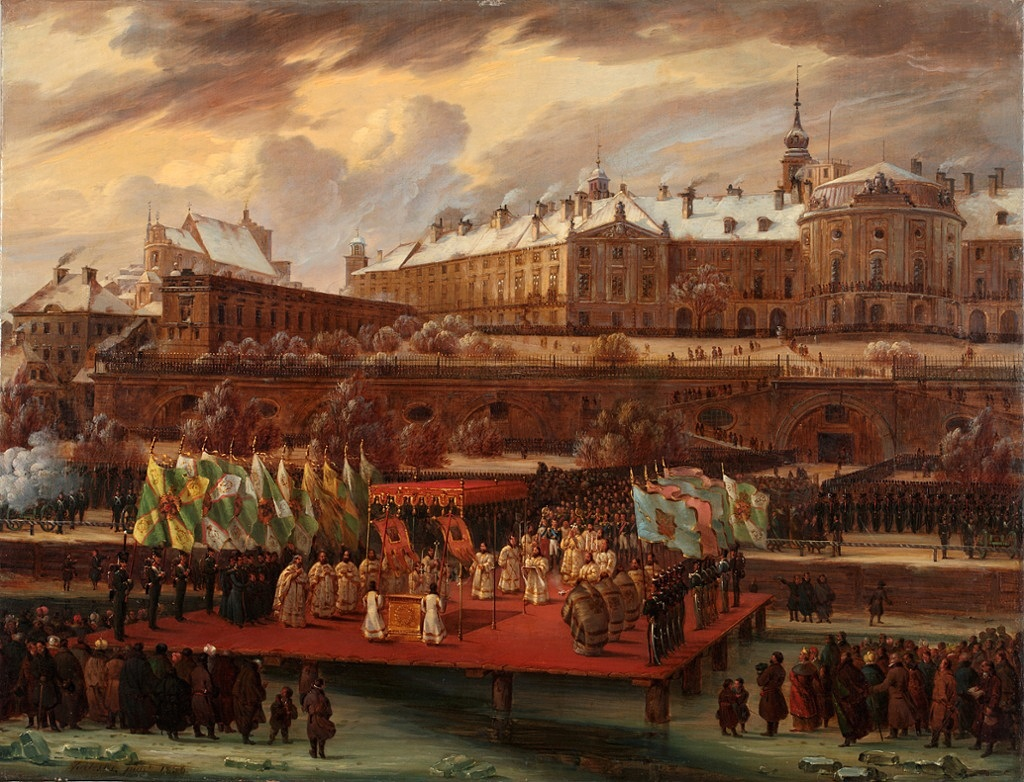
The Feast of Jordan, 1836

== See also ==
- List of Polish painters
