= Mękarzów =

- Village
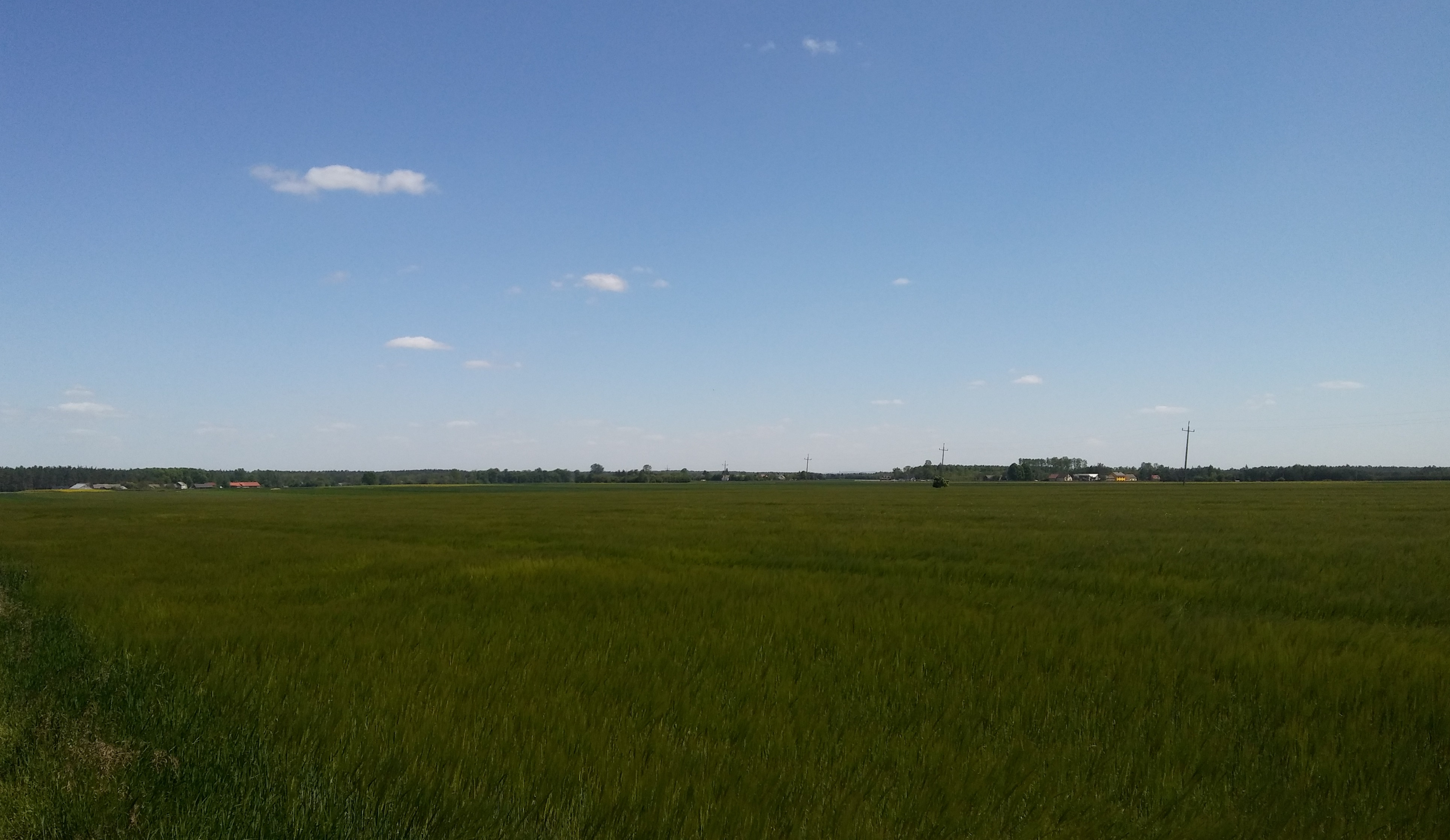

- Location within Poland
- Coordinates: 50°41′N 19°53′E
- Country: Poland
- Voivodeship: Świętokrzyskie
- County: Włoszczowa
- Gmina: Moskorzew
- Population: 235

Mękarzów [mɛŋˈkaʐuf] is a village in the administrative district of Gmina Moskorzew, within Włoszczowa County, Świętokrzyskie Voivodeship, in south-central Poland. It lies approximately 5 km (3 mi) north-west of Moskorzew, 20 km (12 mi) south of Włoszczowa, and 57 km (35 mi) south-west of the regional capital Kielce.
