= Natalin, Wyszków County =

Natalin
- Village
- Location within Poland
- Coordinates: 52°38′N 21°29′E
- Country: Poland
- Voivodeship: Masovian
- County: Wyszków
- Gmina: Wyszków

Natalin [naˈtalin] is a village in the administrative district of Gmina Wyszków, within Wyszków County, Masovian Voivodeship, in east-central Poland.
