= Kamieńczyk, Wyszków County =

Kamieńczyk
- Village
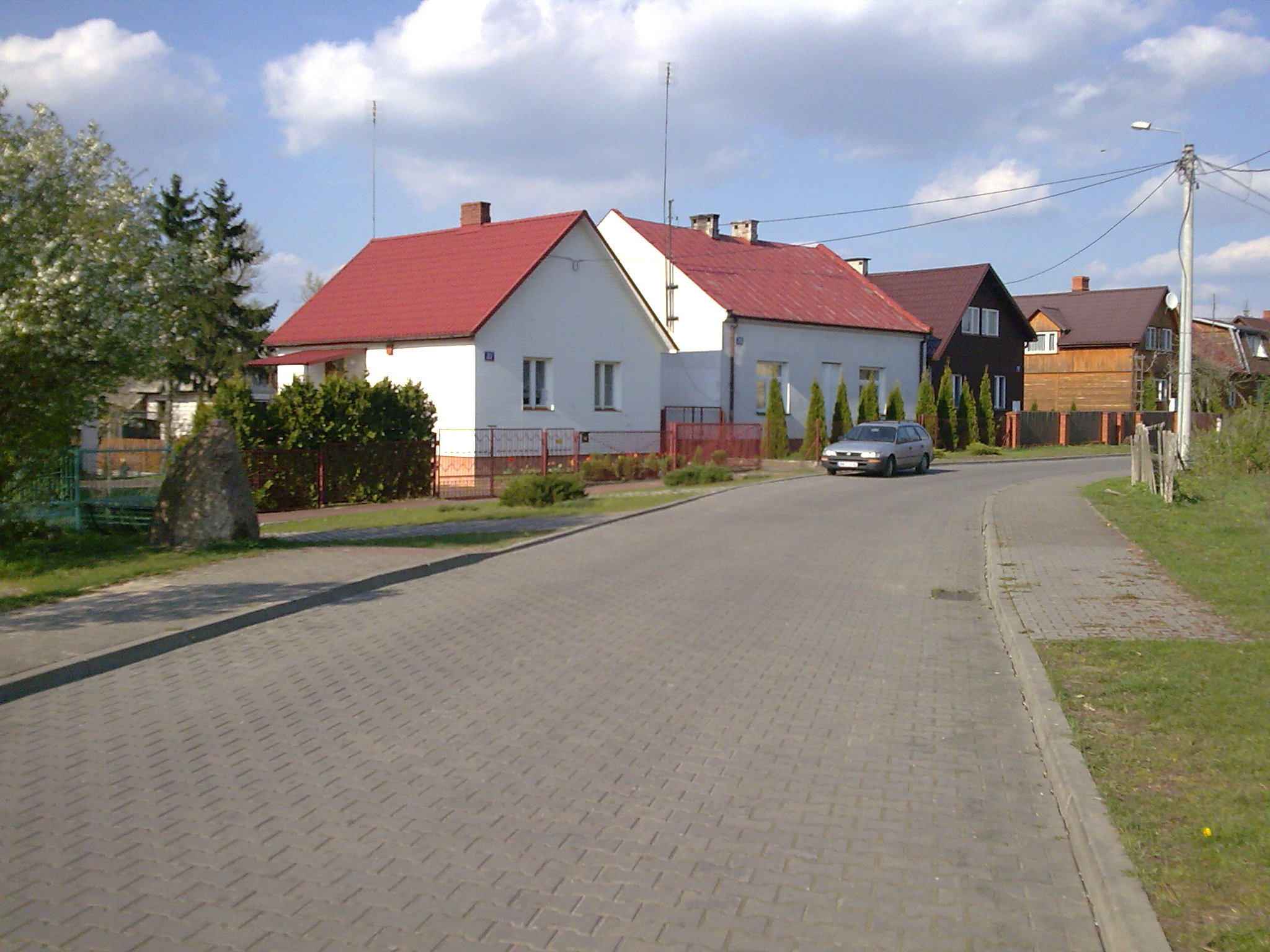

- Location within Poland
- Coordinates: 52°36′N 21°33′E
- Country: Poland
- Voivodeship: Masovian
- County: Wyszków
- Gmina: Wyszków

Population
  - Total: 700
- Time zone: UTC+1 (CET)
  - Summer (DST): UTC+2 (CEST)
- Vehicle registration: WWY

Kamieńczyk (Polish pronunciation: [kaˈmjɛj̃tʂɨk]) is a village in the administrative district of Gmina Wyszków, within Wyszków County, Masovian Voivodeship, in east-central Poland.

Kamieńczyk, which was also called Kamieniec Mazowiecki, is located 5 kilometers east of Wyszkow.

== History ==
This former town has a long history: in 1377 - 1795, it was the seat of a separate castellany (later a county), which belonged to Land of Nur, part of Mazovia. The castellany of Kamienczyk/Kamieniec was established in 1377 in Sochaczew, during a meeting of dukes of the Duchy of Mazovia.

In 1452, Kamieniec received Magdeburg rights, together with a number of privileges. In 1526, together with whole Mazovia, it was annexed by the Kingdom of Poland, and was one of main administrative centers of eastern part of Masovian Voivodeship. In 1565, Kamieniec had a defensive castle, a town hall, a cloth hall, three churches, royal court, a monastery and 189 houses. The town was completely destroyed during the Swedish invasion of Poland (1655 - 1660), and never regained its prominence. In 1869 Kamienczyk lost its town charter. The village suffered during World War II, as it was twice destroyed (1939, 1944).
