= Dalekie, Świętokrzyskie Voivodeship =

Dalekie
- Village
- Location within Poland
- Coordinates: 50°39′N 19°53′E
- Country: Poland
- Voivodeship: Świętokrzyskie
- County: Włoszczowa
- Gmina: Moskorzew
- Population: 72

Dalekie [daˈlɛkʲɛ] is a village in the administrative district of Gmina Moskorzew, within Włoszczowa County, Świętokrzyskie Voivodeship, in south-central Poland. It lies approximately 5 km (3 mi) west of Moskorzew, 24 km (15 mi) south of Włoszczowa, and 58 km (36 mi) south-west of the regional capital Kielce.
