= Kręgi Nowe =

- Village
- Location within Poland
- Coordinates: 52°35′N 21°23′E
- Country: Poland
- Voivodeship: Masovian
- County: Wyszków
- Gmina: Wyszków
- Population: 190

Kręgi Nowe [ˈkrɛnɡi ˈnɔvɛ] is a village in the administrative district of Gmina Wyszków, within Wyszków County, Masovian Voivodeship, in east-central Poland.
