= Gmina Wyszków =

Gmina Wyszków Wyszków Commune
- Gmina
- Flag Coat of arms

- Location within Poland
- Coordinates (Wyszków): 52°35′36″N 21°27′36″E
- Country: Poland
- Voivodeship: Masovian
- County: Wyszków
- Seat: Wyszków

Area
  - Total: 165.6 km^{2} (63.9 sq mi)

Population (2013)
  - Total: 39,161
  - Density: 236.5/km^{2} (612.5/sq mi)
  - Urban: 27,222
  - Rural: 11,939
- Website: http://www.wyszkow.pl

Gmina Wyszków is an urban-rural gmina (administrative district) in Wyszków County, Masovian Voivodeship, in east-central Poland. Its seat is the town of Wyszków, which lies approximately 53 kilometres (33 mi) north-east of Warsaw.

The gmina covers an area of 165.6 square kilometres (63.9 sq mi) and, in 2006, its total population was 37,872 (of which the population of Wyszków amounted to 27,010 and the population of the rural part of the gmina was 10,862).

== Villages ==
Apart from the town of Wyszków, Gmina Wyszków contains the villages and settlements of:

- Deskurów
- Drogoszewo
- Fidest
- Gulczewo
- Kamieńczyk
- Kręgi Nowe
- Leszczydół Działki
- Leszczydół Stary
- Leszczydół-Nowiny
- Leszczydół-Podwielątki
- Leszczydół-Pustki
- Loretto
- Łosinno
- Lucynów
- Lucynów Duży
- Natalin
- Olszanka
- Puste Łąki
- Rybienko Nowe
- Rybienko Stare
- Rybno
- Sitno
- Skuszew
- Ślubów
- Świniotop
- Tulewo
- Tulewo Górne
- Tumanek

== Neighbouring gminas ==
Gmina Wyszków is bordered by the gminas of Brańszczyk, Dąbrówka, Jadów, Łochów, Rząśnik, Somianka and Zabrodzie.
