= Józef Tkaczuk =

Polish graffiti phrase

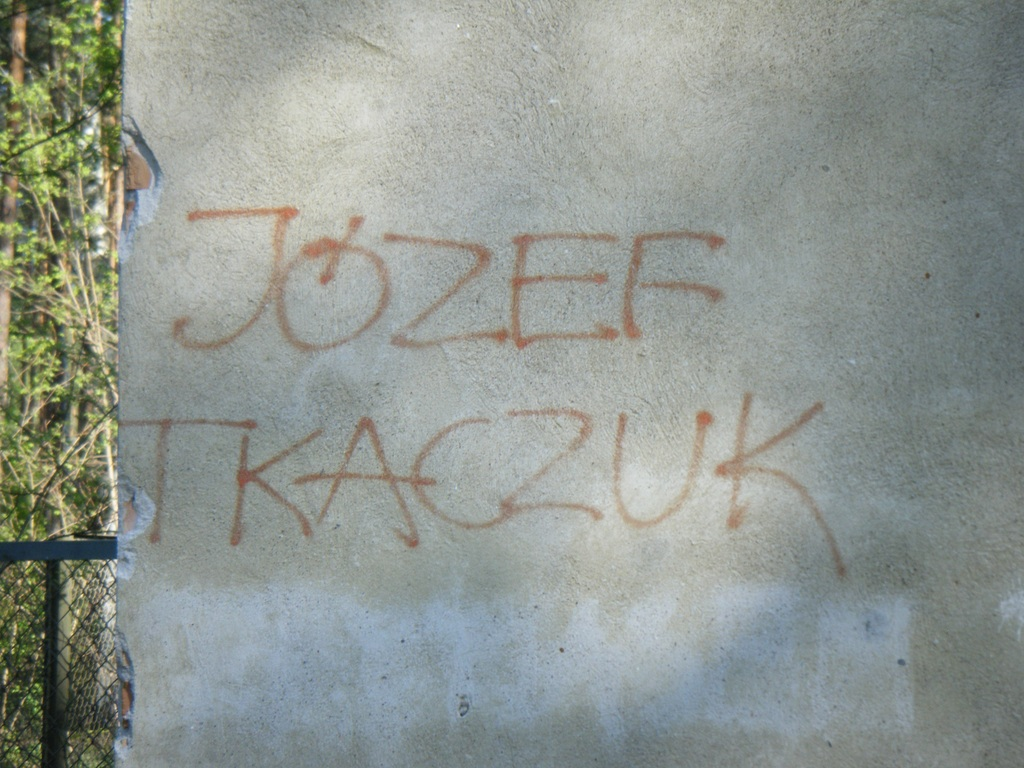
- Józef Tkaczuk tag on a wall in Loretto, Masovian Voivodeship, 2012
- Origin: Poland
- Original form: Graffiti
- Context: Economic depression caused by Balcerowicz Plan
- Coined by: Warsaw students
- Meaning: A heroic everyman symbol

Józef Tkaczuk (Polish pronunciation: [ˈjuzɛf ˈtkat͡ʂuk]) is a Polish graffiti phenomenon often compared to Kilroy was here.

== History ==
Józef Tkaczuk was a janitor at a school in Saska Kępa during the 1980s. Students at the school began to write his name on local walls as a form of retribution for his overbearing enforcement of the school’s rules. The graffiti then spread beyond the locality of Saska Kępa, emerging as a meme found on walls throughout Poland. By 1993 the graffiti had become so recognisable that Józef Tkaczuk was used as a satirical candidate by electors in that year's elections. Józef Tkaczuk graffiti has been reported in many locations outside of Poland including the Alps, Cape Town, Egypt, New York City, and Paris.

As it became common beyond Saska Kępa, Józef Tkaczuk was modified in a variety of ways. Popular additions to the graffiti include Józef Tkaczuk walczy (Józef Tkaczuk fights), Józef Tkaczuk superstar, Tu byłem. Józef Tkaczuk (I was here. Józef Tkaczuk), and an ® has sometimes been added at the end of the name.

The graffiti has been labelled a pop-culture icon in the Gazeta Wyborcza newspaper, whilst the poet Juliusz Erazm Bolek has used Józef Tkaczuk as a synonym for the everyman, describing the graffiti's appearance during the Norse colonization of North America, when Yuri Gagarin travelled to outer space, and when Apollo 11 landed on the Moon. The anthropologist Olga Drenda has described the phenomenon as a typical visual icon of Poland's transition from communism.

== See also ==
- Servít je vůl
