= Rybienko Stare =

- Village
- Location within Poland
- Coordinates: 52°34′42″N 21°26′13″E
- Country: Poland
- Voivodeship: Masovian
- County: Wyszków
- Gmina: Wyszków

Rybienko Stare [rɨˈbjɛŋkɔ ˈstarɛ] is a village in the administrative district of Gmina Wyszków, within Wyszków County, Masovian Voivodeship, in east-central Poland.
