= Świniotop =

- Village
- Location within Poland
- Coordinates: 52°35′N 21°34′E
- Country: Poland
- Voivodeship: Masovian
- County: Wyszków
- Gmina: Wyszków
- Population: 200

Świniotop [ɕfiˈɲɔtɔp] is a village in the administrative district of Gmina Wyszków, within Wyszków County, Masovian Voivodeship, in east-central Poland.
