= Gomel Palace =

Palace in Gomel, Belarus

Coordinates: 52°25′20″N 31°00′59″E

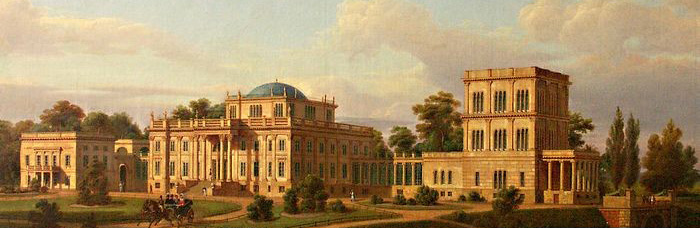
The Gomel Palace under Prince Paskevich (by Marcin Zaleski)

The Rumyantsev-Paskevich Residence (Belarusian: Палац Румянцавых — Паскевічаў; Russian: Дворец Румянцевых — Паскевичей) is the main place of historical importance in the city of Gomel, Belarus. The grounds of the residence stretch for 800 meters along the steep right bank of the Sozh River. An image of the residence is featured on the Belarusian 20-ruble bill.

== History ==
The two-storey palace of Field Marshal Pyotr Rumyantsev was built between 1777 and 1796 to a Neoclassical design attributed to Ivan Starov. The palace replaced the ruined castle of Gomel's previous owner, Michael Frederick Czartoryski.

After Pyotr Rumyantsev's death in 1796, the grounds were slowly improved by his son Nicholas (1754–1826). His brother Sergei was the next owner. He was never interested in country housekeeping and promptly sold the palace to the crown (1834). Gomel was immediately purchased by another Field Marshal, Ivan Paskevich, who had both the palace and the park substantially renovated. He employed architect Adam Idźkowski to add a four-storey tower and a three-storey wing to the existing structure.

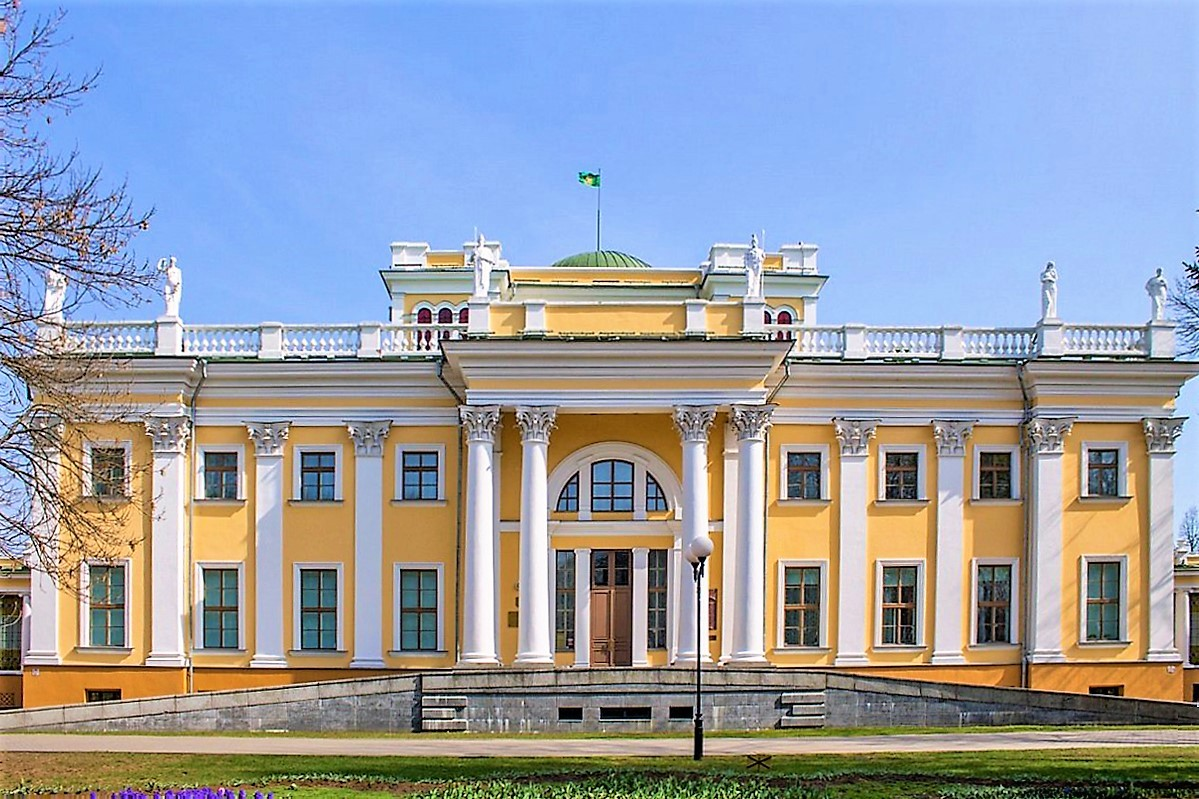
Main entrance to the palace

After the Russian Revolution the palace was nationalized to house a local museum. Paskevich's daughter-in-law Irina had to move from the palace into an ordinary flat. The buildings sustained heavy damage in the Russian Civil War and World War II. In late February and March of 2022 the palace was site of several negotiation sessions between Ukraine and Russia seeking a settlement of their ongoing war, which had begun on 22 February; these talks would come to naught.

The park contains a modern statue of Count Nikolay Rumyantsev. The original marble statues of Euripides, Venus, Athena, Ares, Bacchus, and the Nymph were lost. It was only in 2006 that the replacement statues were put in place. The Paskevich art collection also boasted several paintings by Ivan Kramskoi, Marcin Zaleski, and January Suchodolski, as well as a marble bust of Count Rumyantsev by Antonio Canova.

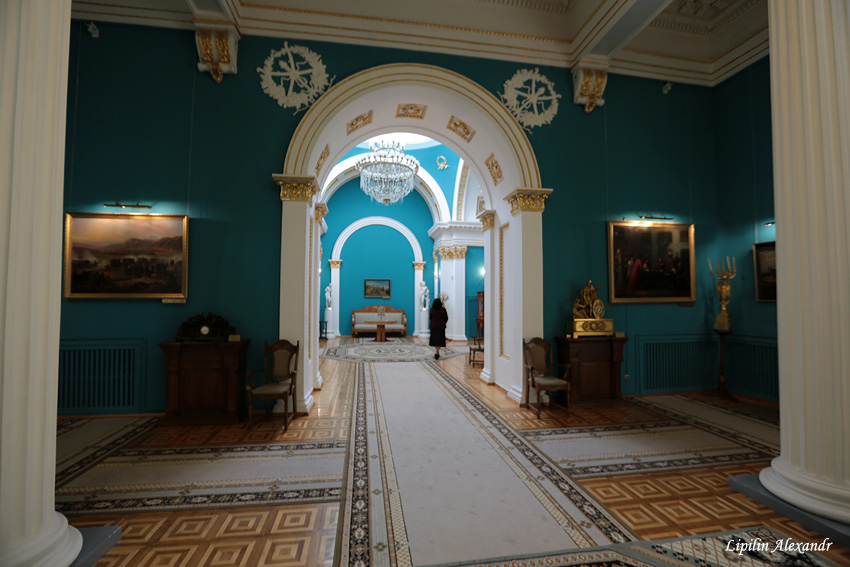
This interior exemplifies the Empire style

The bronze equestrian statue of Prince Joseph Poniatowski by Bertel Thorvaldsen, which Paskevich had brought from Warsaw as a trophy in 1842, was dismantled by the Poles during the Polish-Soviet War and transported back to Warsaw, only to be destroyed by the Germans in the 1940s.

By far the most conspicuous landmark in the park is the Neoclassical church of Sts. Peter and Paul. It was commissioned by Count Nikolay Rumyantsev from architect John Clark in 1809 but was not consecrated until 1824. The church is the seat of the local Orthodox bishopric.

== Other Rumyantsev residences ==
- Tashan, Ukraine
- Kachanivka
