= Tulewo Górne =

- Village
- Location within Poland
- Coordinates: 52°34′18″N 21°23′39″E
- Country: Poland
- Voivodeship: Masovian
- County: Wyszków
- Gmina: Wyszków

Tulewo Górne [tuˈlɛvɔ ˈɡurnɛ] is a village in the administrative district of Gmina Wyszków, within Wyszków County, Masovian Voivodeship, in east-central Poland.
