= Rybienko Nowe =

Village in Masovian Voivodeship, Poland

- Village
- Location within Poland
- Coordinates: 52°35′16″N 21°25′28″E
- Country: Poland
- Voivodeship: Masovian
- County: Wyszków
- Gmina: Wyszków

Rybienko Nowe [rɨˈbjɛŋkɔ ˈnɔvɛ] is a village in the administrative district of Gmina Wyszków, within Wyszków County, Masovian Voivodeship, in east-central Poland.
