= Servít je vůl =

Czech graffiti phrase

Servít is an asshole
- Servít je vůl
- Type: Graffiti
- Writing: Latin script
- Created: 1960s, Czechoslovakia
- Culture: Czech

Servít je vůl (pronounced [ˈsɛrviːt jɛ ˈvuːl], transl. Servít is an asshole, lit. 'Servít is an ox') is a Czech phrase which became famous as a graffito. It started to appear in the 1960s as a students' joke in restrooms of bars in Prague. Later, however, it became a part of popular culture and has spread around the world, often in modified wording.

== Background ==
The original inspiration for this phrase is believed to be Radim Servít, an instructor at the Faculty of Civil Engineering of the Czech Technical University in Prague (CTU). He taught elasticity and strength of materials in the 1960s and was infamous for his extensive rigour in exams. Later accounts claim the phrase refers to a different person of the same name.

== Time progression and spread ==
Students started writing the words Servít je vůl on the walls of public restrooms in bars nearby the CTU campus. Thanks to the political mood in the 1960s Czechoslovakia, this graffiti has gradually spread out of Prague, the country and Europe through students and their voices. These graffiti have prevailed for generations all around the world.

Some of the confirmed locations where this graffiti has been found include:

- Empire State Building
- Eiffel Tower
- a Milan train station
- a New York City Subway station
- Gerlachovský štít
- a train station in Nesebar, Bulgaria
- restrooms in London
- a corridor of the canteen in the Soviet polar station Mirny in Antarctica

As time progressed, various new versions of the phrase were created, for example: Doopravdy nejsem vůl, Servít ('I'm really not an asshole, Servít'), Všichni jste volové! Servít ('You are all assholes! Servít'), Promiň Servíte jsou i větší volové ('Sorry Servít, there are bigger assholes than you') and so on.

== See also ==
- Józef Tkaczuk
- Kilroy was here
- Latrinalia
- Srbija do Tokija
