= Puste Łąki =

- Village
- Location within Poland
- Coordinates: 52°33′N 21°35′E
- Country: Poland
- Voivodeship: Masovian
- County: Wyszków
- Gmina: Wyszków
- Time zone: UTC+1 (CET)
  - Summer (DST): UTC+2 (CEST)

Puste Łąki [ˈpustɛ ˈwɔŋki] is a village in the administrative district of Gmina Wyszków, within Wyszków County, Masovian Voivodeship, in east-central Poland.

Eight Polish citizens were murdered by Nazi Germany in the village during World War II.
