= Gmina Moskorzew =

Gmina Moskorzew Moskorzew Commune
- Gmina
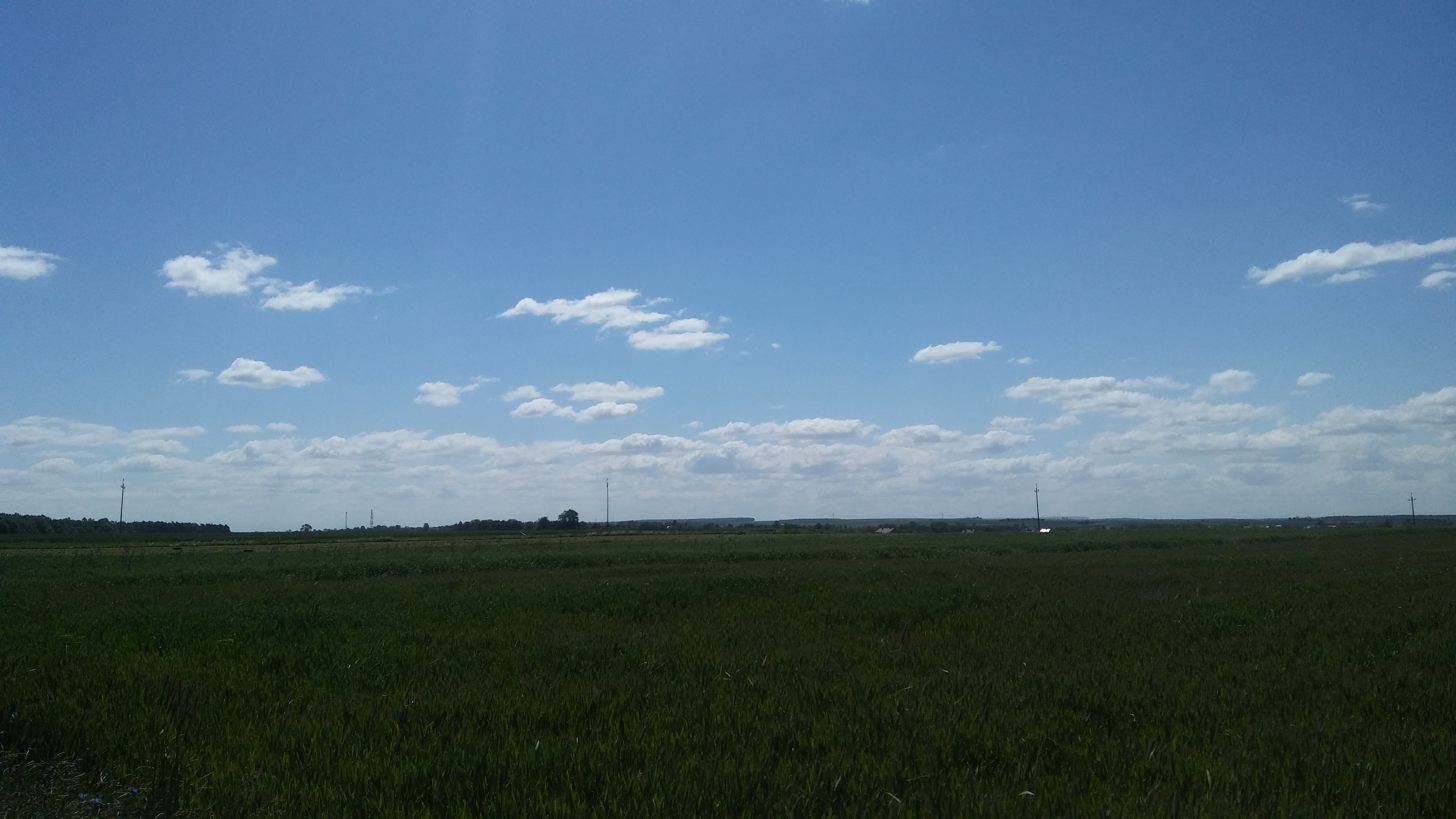

- Flag Coat of arms

- Location within Poland
- Coordinates (Moskorzew): 50°39′47″N 19°56′30″E
- Country: Poland
- Voivodeship: Świętokrzyskie
- County: Włoszczowa
- Seat: Moskorzew

Area
  - Total: 71.29 km^{2} (27.53 sq mi)

Population (2006)
  - Total: 2,930
  - Density: 41.1/km^{2} (106/sq mi)
- Postal code: 29-130
- Area code: +48 34
- Car plates: TLW
- Website: http://www.moskorzew.pl/

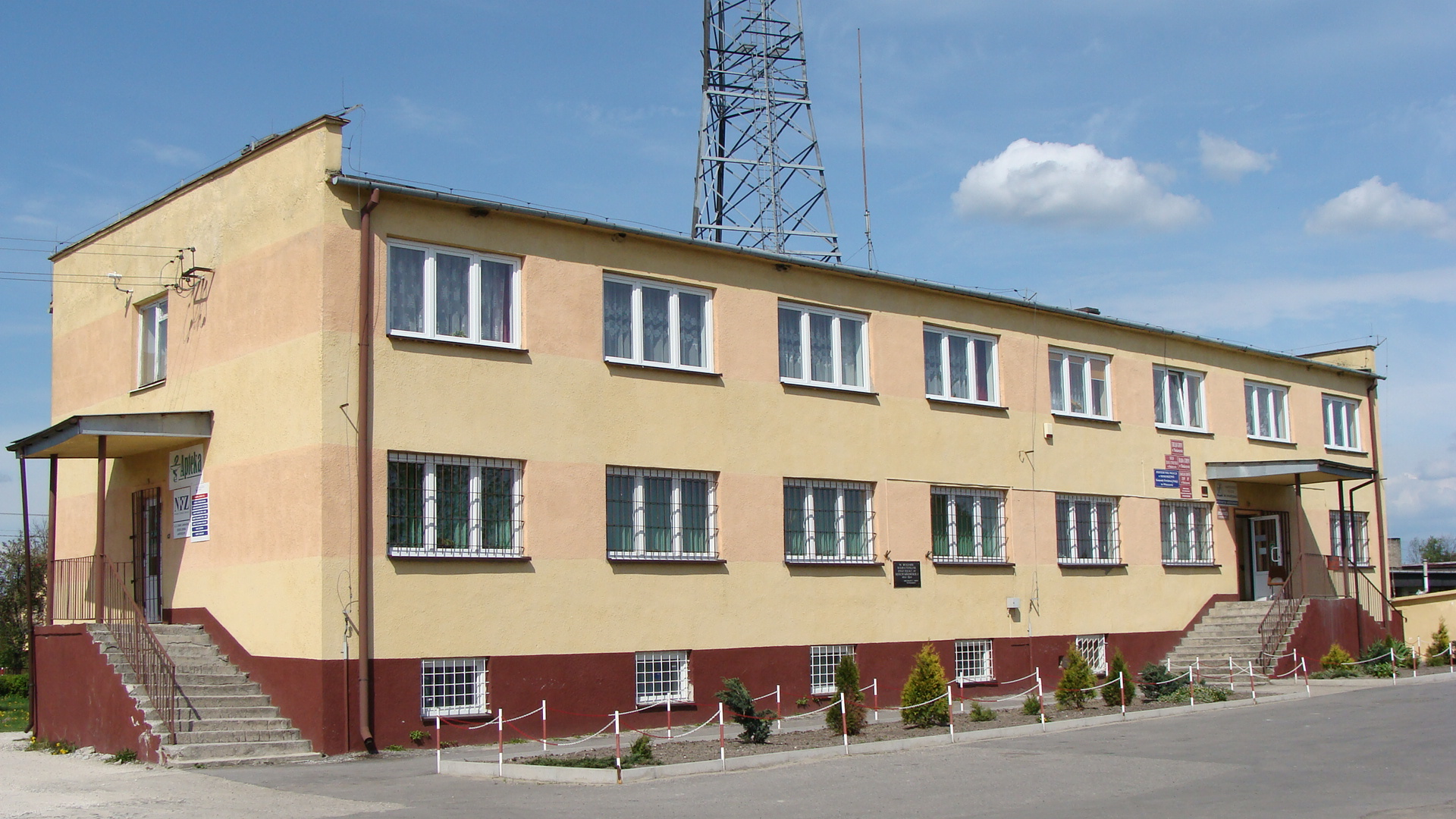
Building of the Commune Office

Gmina Moskorzew is a rural gmina (administrative district) in Włoszczowa County, Świętokrzyskie Voivodeship, in south-central Poland. Its seat is the village of Moskorzew, which lies approximately 22 kilometres (14 mi) south of Włoszczowa and 54 km (34 mi) south-west of the regional capital Kielce.

The gmina covers an area of 71.29 square kilometres (27.5 sq mi), and as of 2006 its total population is 2,930.

== Villages ==
Gmina Moskorzew contains the villages and settlements of Chebdzie, Chlewice, Chlewska Wola, Dąbrówka, Dalekie, Damiany, Jadwigów, Lubachowy, Mękarzów, Moskorzew, Perzyny, Przybyszów and Tarnawa Góra.

== Neighbouring gminas ==
Gmina Moskorzew is bordered by the gminas of Nagłowice, Radków, Słupia and Szczekociny.
