= Latrinalia =

Graffiti in toilet facilities

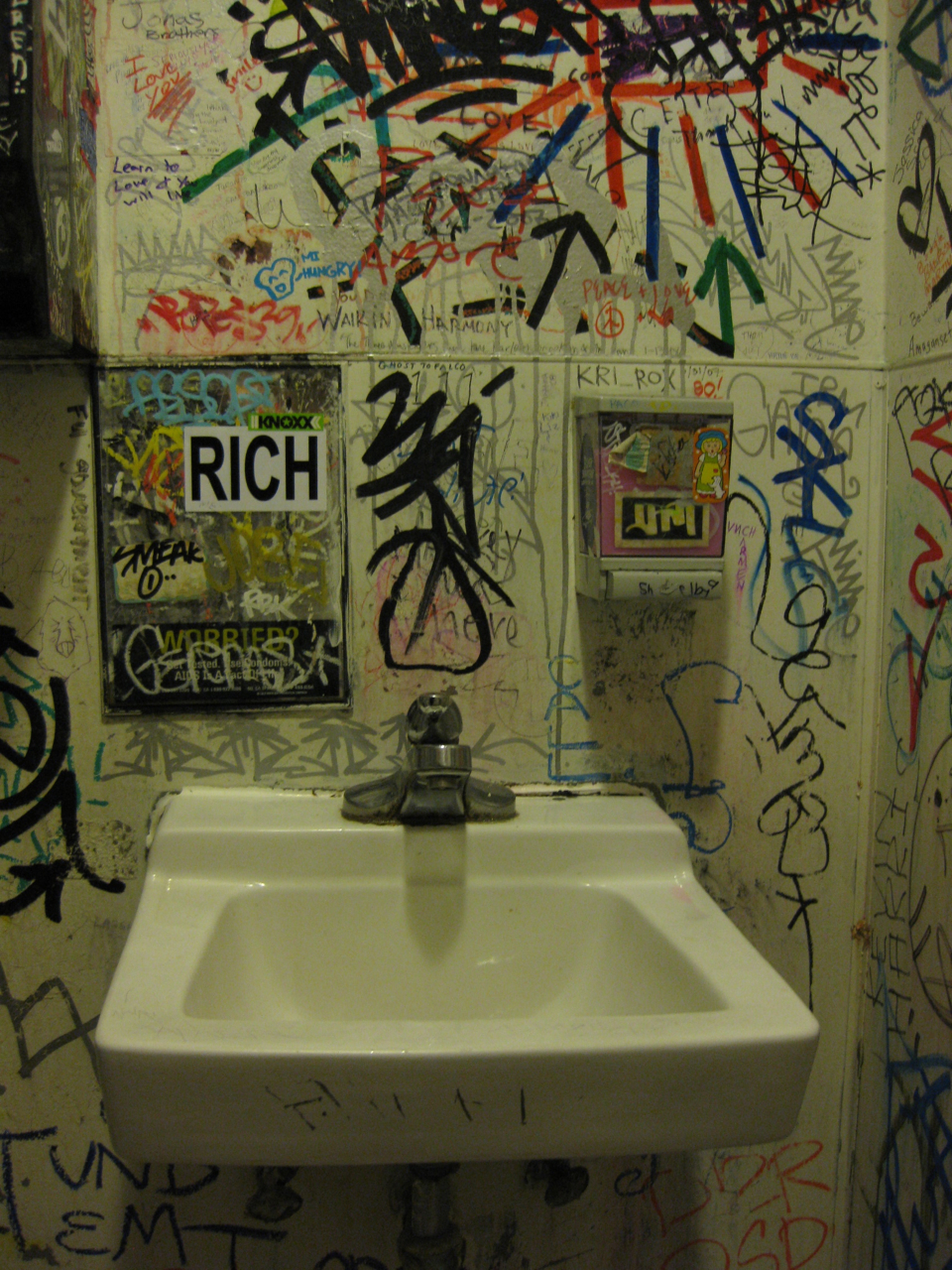
Restroom graffiti, People's Cafe, San Francisco

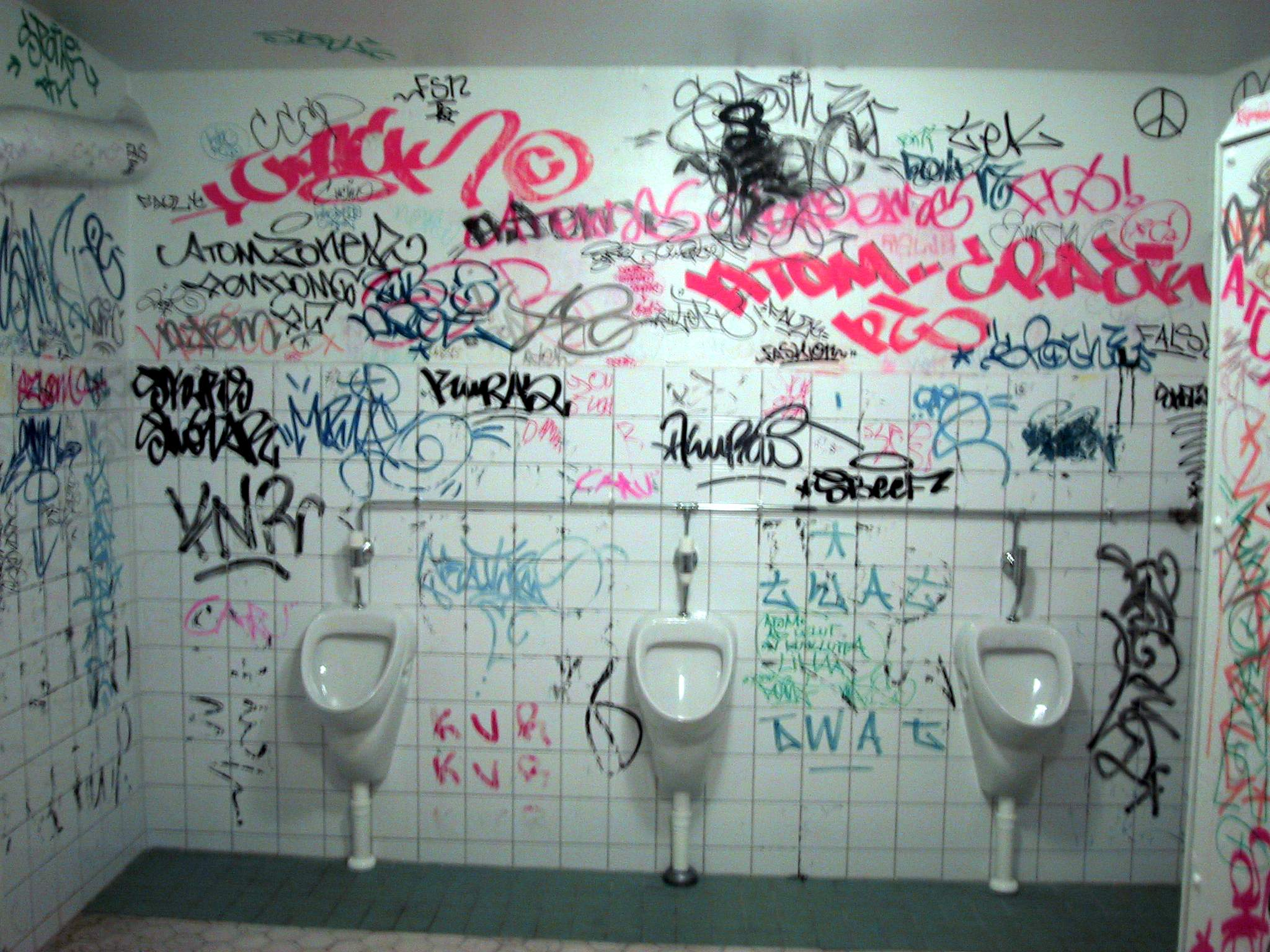
Graffiti at Meilahti Yläaste. Helsinki, Finland, 2006

Latrinalia are deliberately inscribed or etched markings made on the walls of lavatorial facilities. They can take the form of words, including poetry and personal reflections, drawings, or other forms of art. Other types of latrinalia include political commentary and notes on love as well as derogatory comments and pictures. Humor is also common, such as the phenomenon observed on some college campuses of writing puns about grout in the grouted spaces between tiles. When done without the property owner's consent, latrinalia constitute vandalism. Some venues have attempted to curb such vandalism by installing in the lavatory large blackboards and providing free chalk; it is hoped that patrons will avail themselves of the blackboard and chalk rather than applying their latrinalia directly to the walls or toilet stalls.

== Study and etymology ==
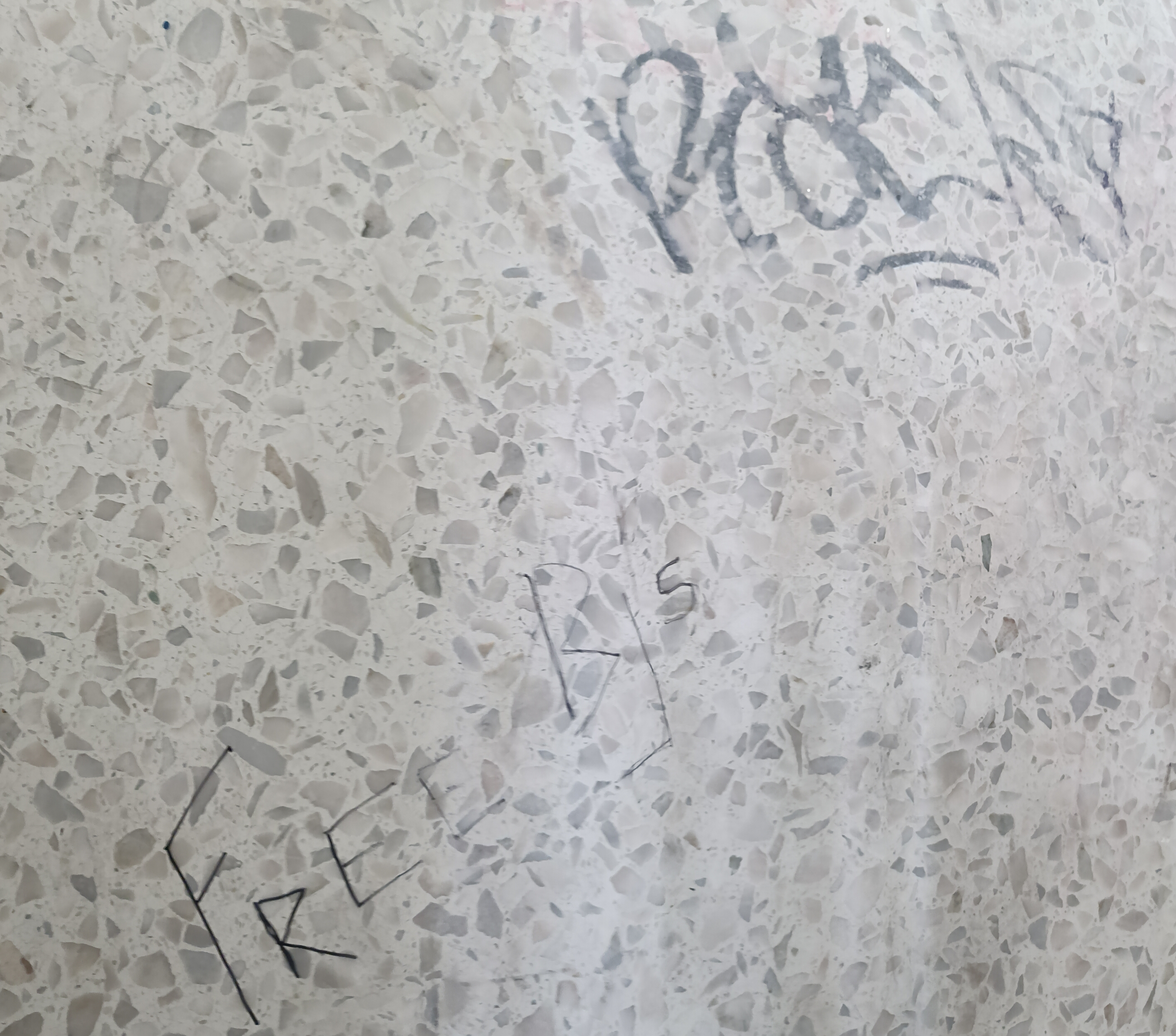
Graffiti on the side of a cubicle in a male toilet. Sydney, Australia, 2024

An important work in the study of latrinalia is Allen Walker Read's Lexical Evidence from Folk Epigraphy in Western North America: A Glossarial Study of the Low Element in the English Vocabulary. The work describes and collates examples of graffiti observed by Read on a road trip throughout the Western United States in 1928. It was privately published in Paris in 1935 since its description of bathroom graffiti was considered too racy for American publishers. It was eventually published in the United States in 1977, under the title Classic American Graffiti. The work was described as a classic "model study" of latrinalia that "deserves the attention of any serious student of American language" in a 1979 review, which noted that even then it remained hard to access and "excessively rare."

The late Alan Dundes, a folklorist at University of California, Berkeley, coined the term latrinalia in 1966 to refer to graffiti found in restrooms. Dundes preferred it over the term shithouse poetry, as not all latrinalia are in verse or poetic form.

The word is derived from the compounding of latrine (toilet) and the suffix -alia, a Latinate plural form referring to a collection of something — in this case bathroom writings.

== See also ==
- Graffiti
- Servít je vůl
- Toilet humour
- Vandalism

== Bibliography ==
- Gelfer, Joseph (2002). The Little Book of Toilet Graffiti. Summersdale Publishers. ISBN 978-1840242607.
- Haslam, Nick (2012). "Toilet Graffiti". Psychology in the Bathroom. London: Palgrave Macmillan. pp. 114–135. doi:10.1057/9780230367555_7. ISBN 978-0-230-36755-5.
- Trahan, Adam (2016). "Research and theory on latrinalia". In Ross, Jeffrey Ian (ed.). Routledge Handbook of Graffiti and Street Art. London: Routledge. pp. 92–102. ISBN 978-1-138-79293-7.
- Norbert Siegl: Geschlechtsspezifische Unterschiede hinsichtlich Häufigkeit und thematischer Inhalte bei Toilettengraffiti. Thiel, Kassel 1992, ISBN 3-923548-78-8 (Zugleich Diplomarbeit an der Universität Wien 1992).
- Norbert Siegl: Graffiti von Frauen und Männern. Das Basiswerk der Klo-Graffiti-Forschung. graffiti-edition, Wien 2000, ISBN 3-901927-05-0.
- Norbert Siegl: Kommunikation am Klo. Graffiti von Frauen und Männern. Döcker, Wien 1995, ISBN 3-8511-5178-X.
- orbert Siegl: Die Themen der Graffiti-Forschung. Wien 2000
