= Fidest =

- Village
- Location within Poland
- Coordinates: 52°33′02″N 21°30′27″E
- Country: Poland
- Voivodeship: Masovian
- County: Wyszków
- Gmina: Wyszków
- Population: 100

Fidest [ˈfidɛst] is a village in the administrative district of Gmina Wyszków, within Wyszków County, Masovian Voivodeship, in east-central Poland.
