= Olszanka, Wyszków County =

Olszanka
- Village
- Location within Poland
- Coordinates: 52°36′N 21°23′E
- Country: Poland
- Voivodeship: Masovian
- County: Wyszków
- Gmina: Wyszków

Olszanka [ɔlˈʂaŋka] is a village in the administrative district of Gmina Wyszków, within Wyszków County, Masovian Voivodeship, in east-central Poland.

According to official statistical data from the Polish national census, the village of Olszanka had a population of 451 residents as of 2021.
