= Moskorzew =

- Village
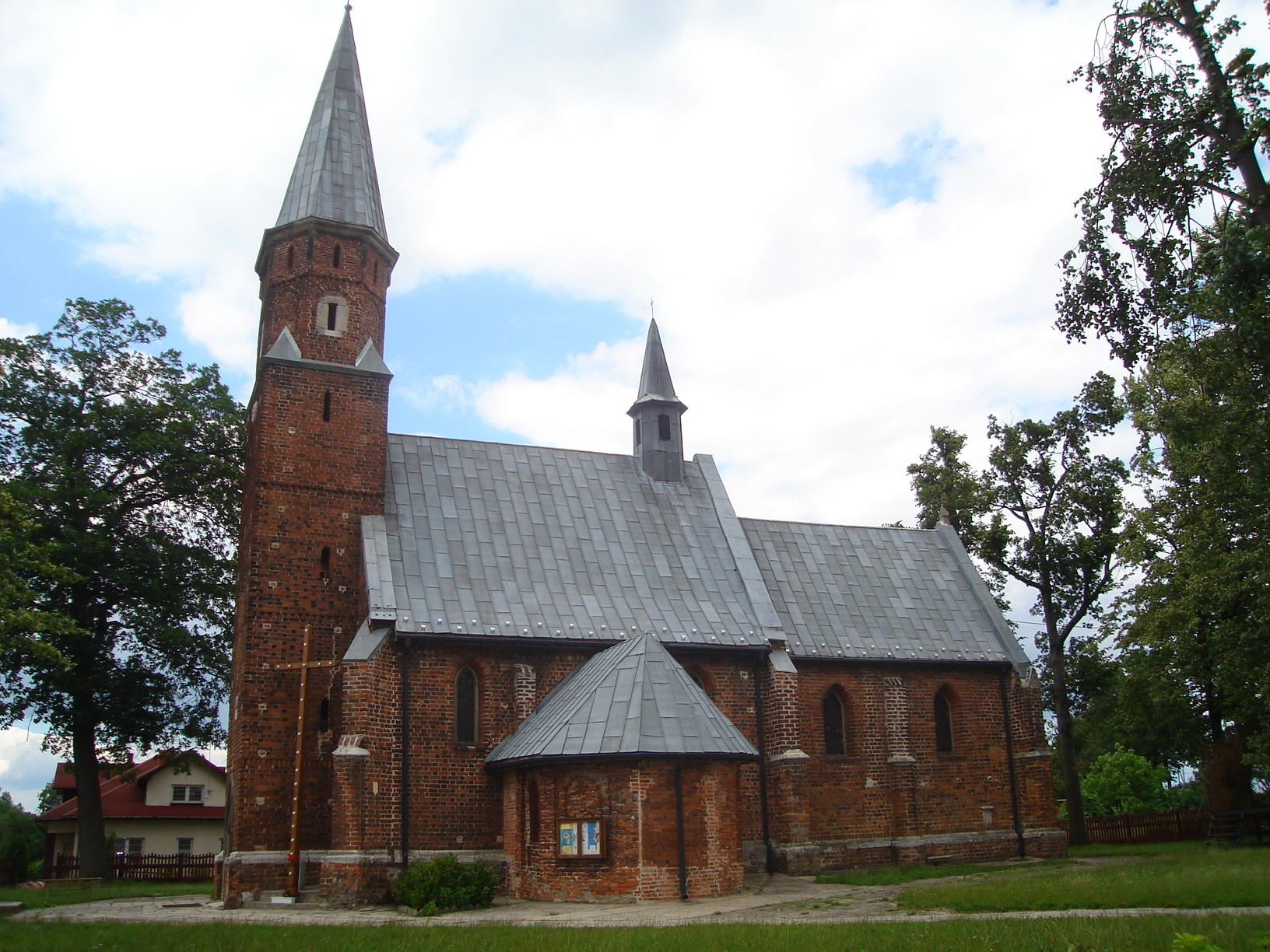
- Church of Saint Margaret

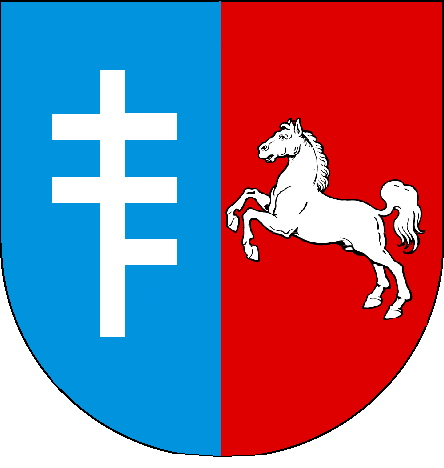
- Coat of arms

- Location within Poland
- Coordinates: 50°39′N 19°56′E
- Country: Poland
- Voivodeship: Świętokrzyskie
- County: Włoszczowa
- Gmina: Moskorzew

Population
  - Total: 644
- Posta code: 29-130
- Area code: +48 34
- Car plates: TLW

Moskorzew [mɔsˈkɔʐɛf] is a village in Włoszczowa County, Świętokrzyskie Voivodeship, in south-central Poland. It is the seat of the gmina (administrative district) called Gmina Moskorzew. It lies approximately 23 km (14 mi) south of Włoszczowa and 55 km (34 mi) south-west of the regional capital Kielce.
