= Kurpie Białe =

Ethnographic group of Polish people

Kurpśe Bźałe
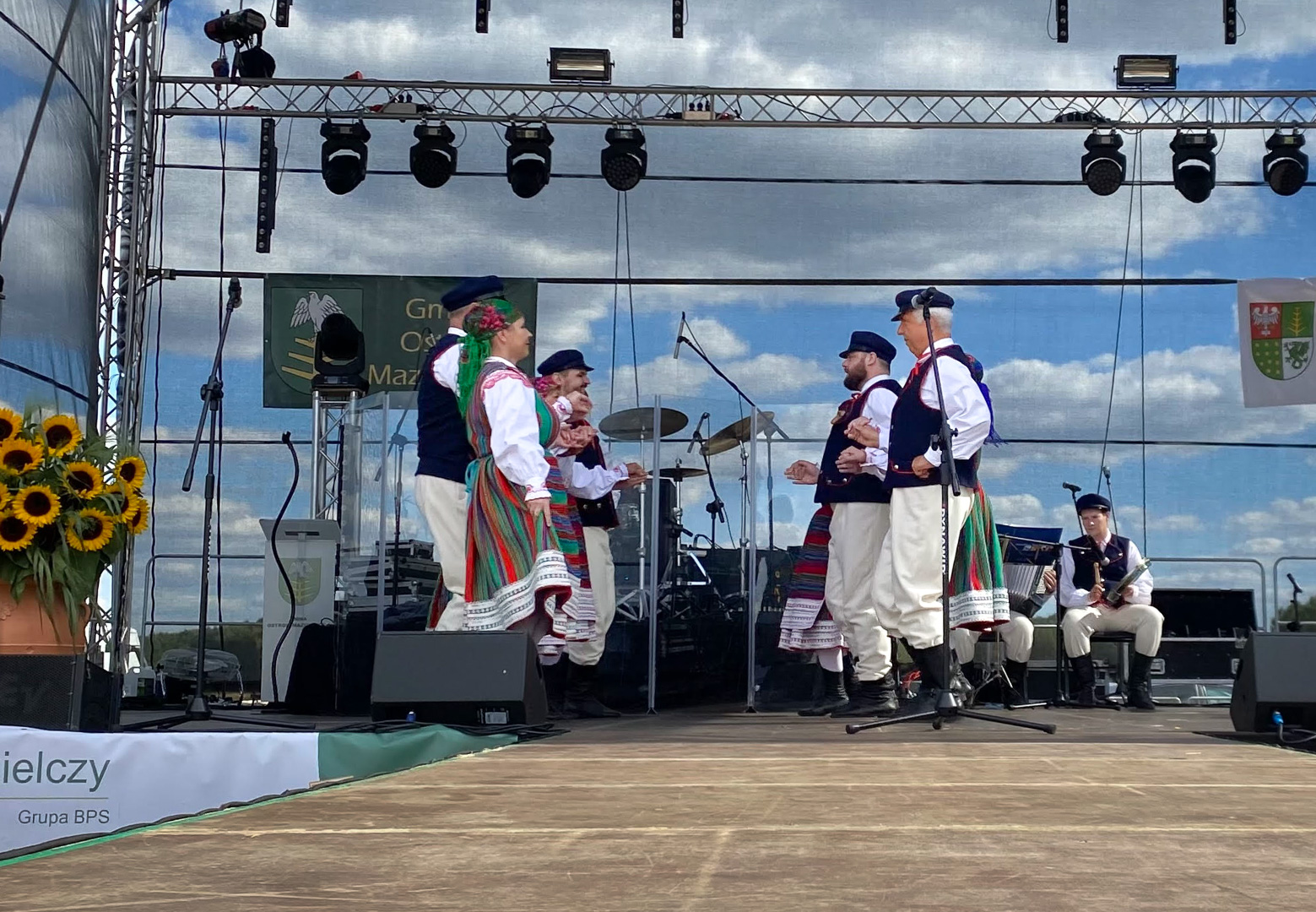

Regions with significant populations
- Puszcza Biała, Poland

Languages
- Polish (Kurpie dialect)

Related ethnic groups
- Polish people (Masovians)

Kurpie Białe is an ethnographic group of Polish people inhabiting the Puszcza Biała region in Mazovia.

They are descendants of families settled in the area during the 18th century by the bishops of Płock, the landowners of the forest. These settlers were tasked with repopulating the Puszcza Biskupia area, which had experienced depopulation due to the Swedish wars, Cossack invasions, and epidemics. The migration of settlers occurred primarily between 1730 and 1790, with most originating from Puszcza Zielona, where they possessed valuable knowledge in forest management, including skills as honey hunters, charcoal burners, potash burners, meadow caretakers, and hunters. Unlike the serfdom that had been prevalent in surrounding villages since medieval times, these settlers were granted leasehold rights.

The relative isolation of the region, although less pronounced than that of Puszcza Zielona, contributed to the development of a distinct culture among the Kurpie Białe. This culture encompasses both material aspects—such as paper cuttings, weaving, traditional clothing, embroidery, sculpture, pottery, wickerwork, household decorations, and ritual art—and spiritual elements, including songs, rituals, and customs. The subdialect and architectural style of Kurpie Białe share similarities with those found in Puszcza Zielona.

This region is less well-known than the Kurpie Zielone. In the 21st century, various local initiatives have emerged aimed at preserving and revitalizing the customs, traditions, and history of Kurpie Białe. Cultural artifacts from the Kurpie Biała community can be viewed in institutions such as the Kurpie Culture Museum in Ostrołęka, the Regional Museum in Pułtusk, the Ethnographic-Historical Museum in Kamieńczyk, the Maria Żywirska Open-Air Museum in Brańszczyk, and the Kurpie Forge in Pniewo, an institution managed by the association "Puszcza Biała – My Little Homeland". Libraries, cultural centers (e.g., in Pułtusk and Ostrów Mazowiecka), memory chambers, and non-governmental organizations—such as the Association of Friends of Puszcza Biała and Kamieniecka, as well as rural women's groups—play an active role in promoting and preserving the culture of Kurpie Białe.

== Name ==
The name "Kurpie Białe" (White Kurpie) is derived from the Puszcza Biała (White Forest), the region where these settlers lived. This designation differentiates them from the Kurpie Zielone (Green Kurpie), who inhabit Puszcza Zielona, while also highlighting the historical connection between the two groups, as settlers from Puszcza Zielona were relocated to Puszcza Biała in the 18th century. Adam Dobroński noted that the term "Kurpie", referring to individuals exploiting forest resources, was used in Mazovia, including Puszcza Biała, long before the 18th century.

In the 19th century, the term Kurpie Gocie (or Kurpie-Gocie) began to refer specifically to the inhabitants of Puszcza Biała. Kazimierz Władysław Wóycicki recorded that, unlike those in Puszcza Zielona, the Kurpie Gocie were subject to corvée labor. Although customs, rituals, and architecture were generally consistent between the two groups, their clothing exhibited differences. The term Kurpie Gocie was also used by various authors, including Michał Morzkowski, Stanisław Chełchowski, J. Maciejewski, Felicjan Kozłowski, Wincenty Pol, Aleksander Połujański, and others. Henryk Syska referenced this term in the title of his 1955 book Obleciałem Kurpie Gocie (I Flew Over Kurpie Gocie) published in Warsaw. He suggested that the term "Gocie" derived from "gołocie", which described treeless areas. He provided examples of similar naming changes in local villages, such as Bogusze becoming Buksy or Bugzy, and Kowalewo transforming into Kuwlewo or Kuflewo.

Syska theorized that the term Gocie was introduced by Kurpie Zielone settlers when they encountered serfs in the treeless areas of the bishopric estates. The term Kurpie Gocie was later adopted by a folk group from Golądkowo. In 1958, the Zielone Kurpie Gocie Group was formed at the Pedagogical Secondary School in Pułtusk.

Given the lack of a definitive explanation for the origin of the term "Kurpie Gocie", it is preferable to use the name Kurpie Białe. Dobroński emphasized the distinction between the Kurpie in Puszcza Biała—who were free residents, forest workers, and leasehold farmers—and the Gocie, who were serfs residing in the bishopric area prior to the 18th century and gradually transitioned to leaseholder status from the mid-18th century onward.

== Identity of Kurpie Białe ==
In Puszcza Biała, the term Kurpie historically carried negative connotations, often used to describe individuals as foreign, rude, or uncouth. When Maria Żywirska conducted research in the Kurpie village of Białopuszcza and inquired about the Kurpie, she was directed elsewhere in the forest, reflecting a broader rejection of Kurpie identity. Similar dismissals were experienced by post-war researchers investigating Kurpie Białe, despite the fact that the Pułtusk cooperative was producing numerous items explicitly labeled as Kurpie during that time.

In the second decade of the 21st century, there has been a growing recognition of the history and culture of Kurpie Białe, alongside an increasing regional identity that fosters pride in Kurpie heritage. However, the term "Kurpie Białe" has often been inaccurately applied to all residents of Puszcza Biała. In addition to the Kurpie settlers brought to Puszcza Biskupia in the 18th century, the area has been home to a serf peasantry since the Middle Ages. The villages also included native Mazovians, as well as Jewish and German settlers, who were primarily brought in for drainage projects and tended to settle in compact communities, such as Wincentowo, Nury, and Marianowo.

== Origins and settlement ==
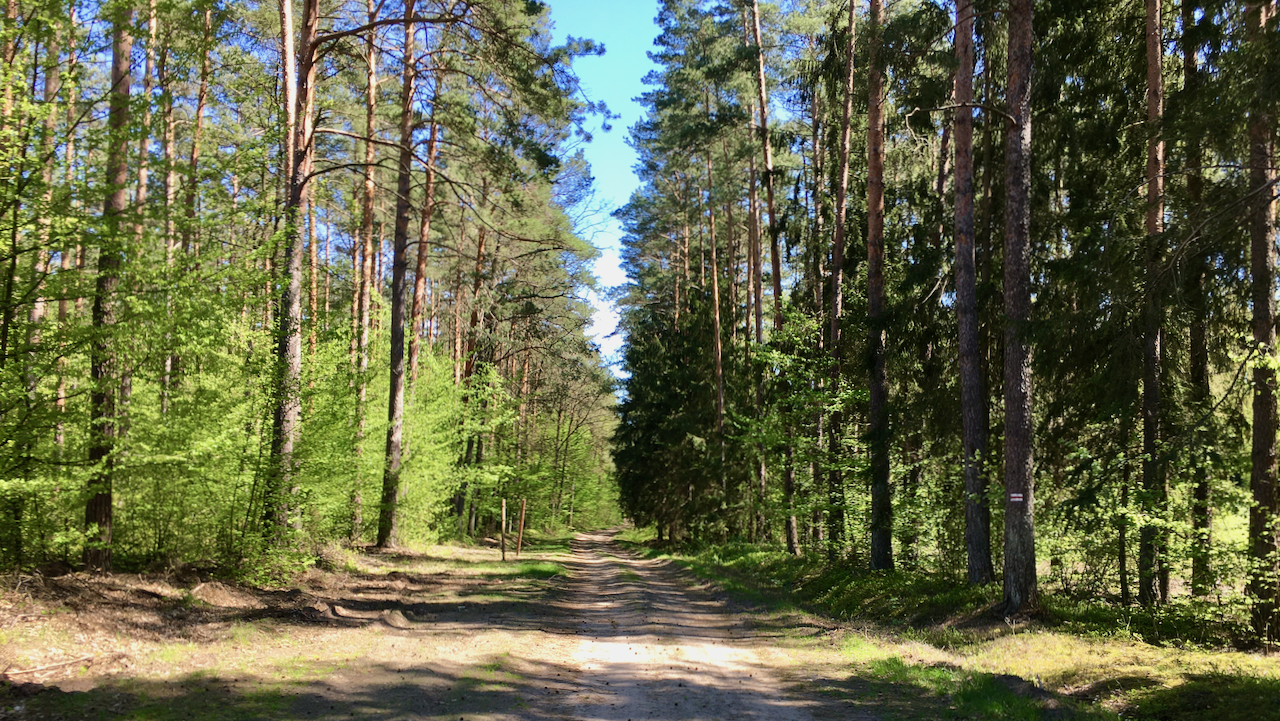
Puszcza Biała near Brańszczyk

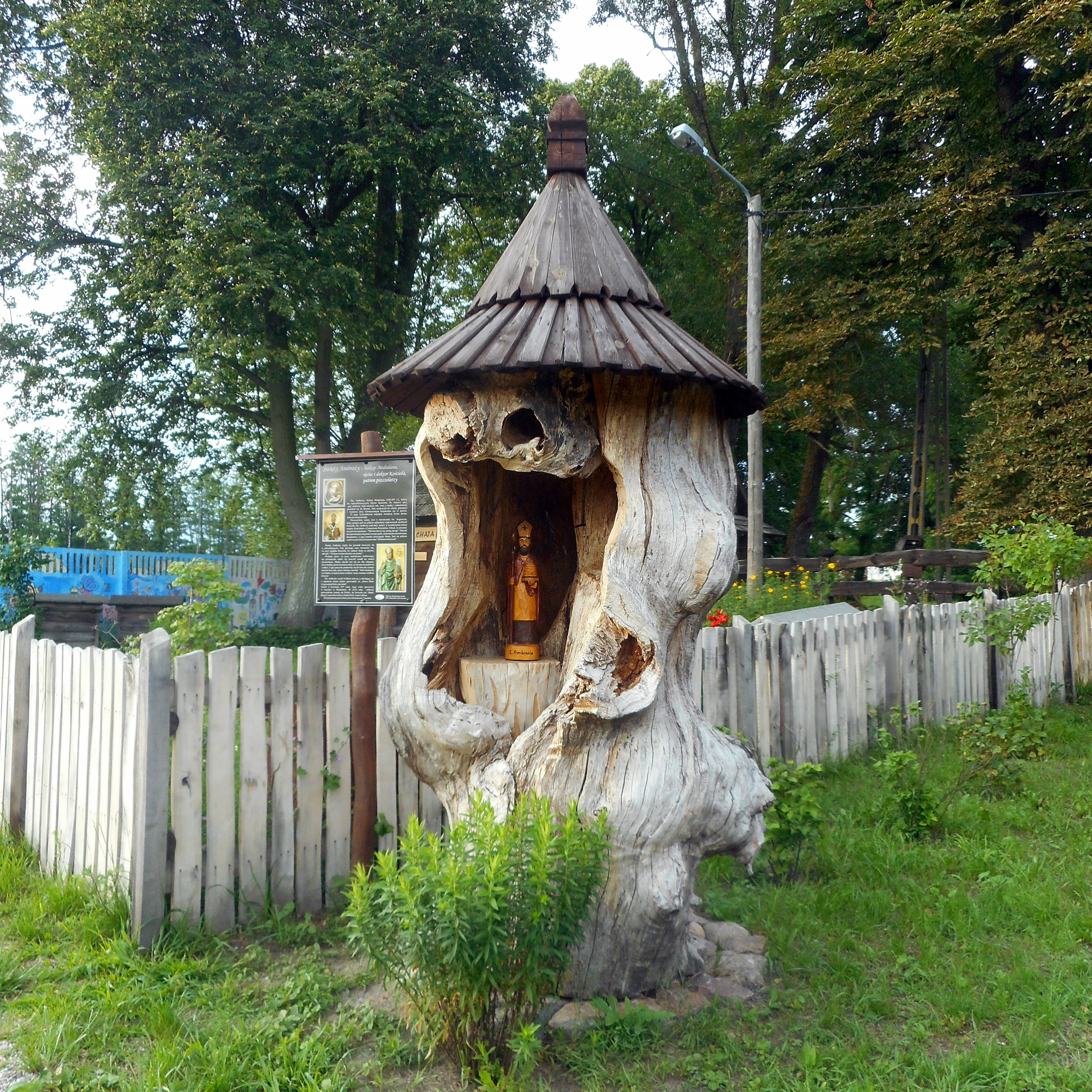
Chapel of St. Ambrose, patron of beekeepers, in the Maria Żywirska Open-Air Museum in Brańszczyk

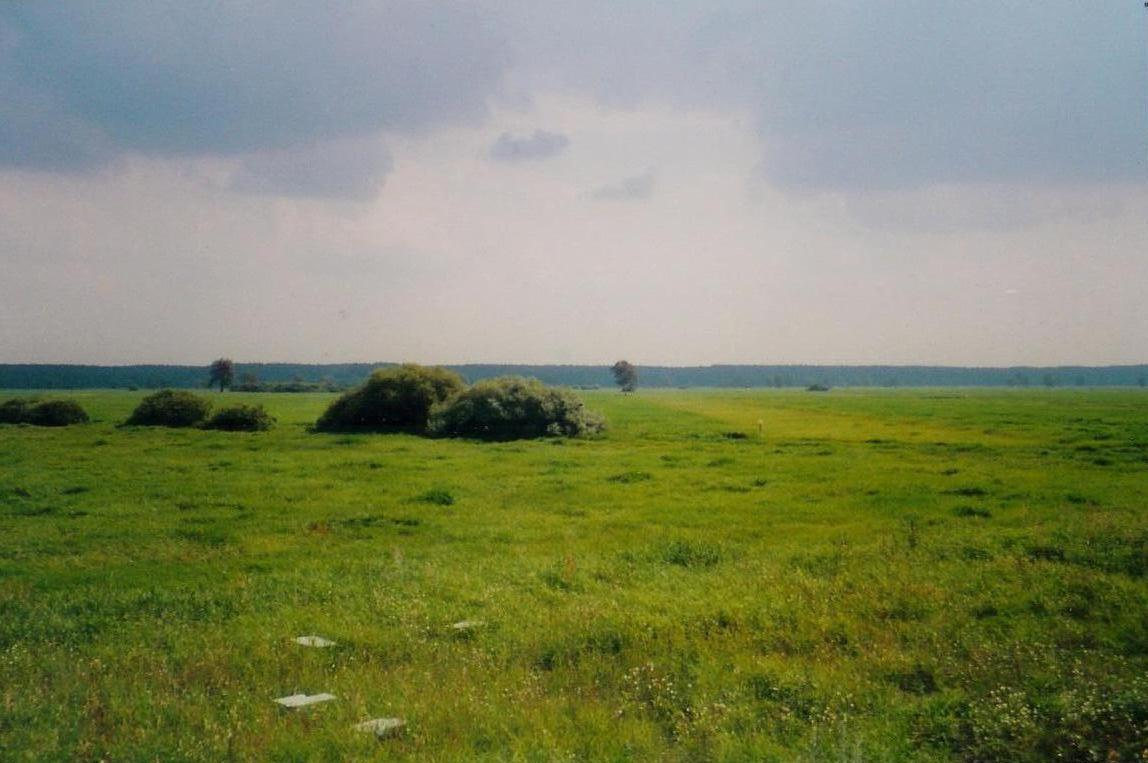
Former swamp Pulwy transformed into meadows and pastures

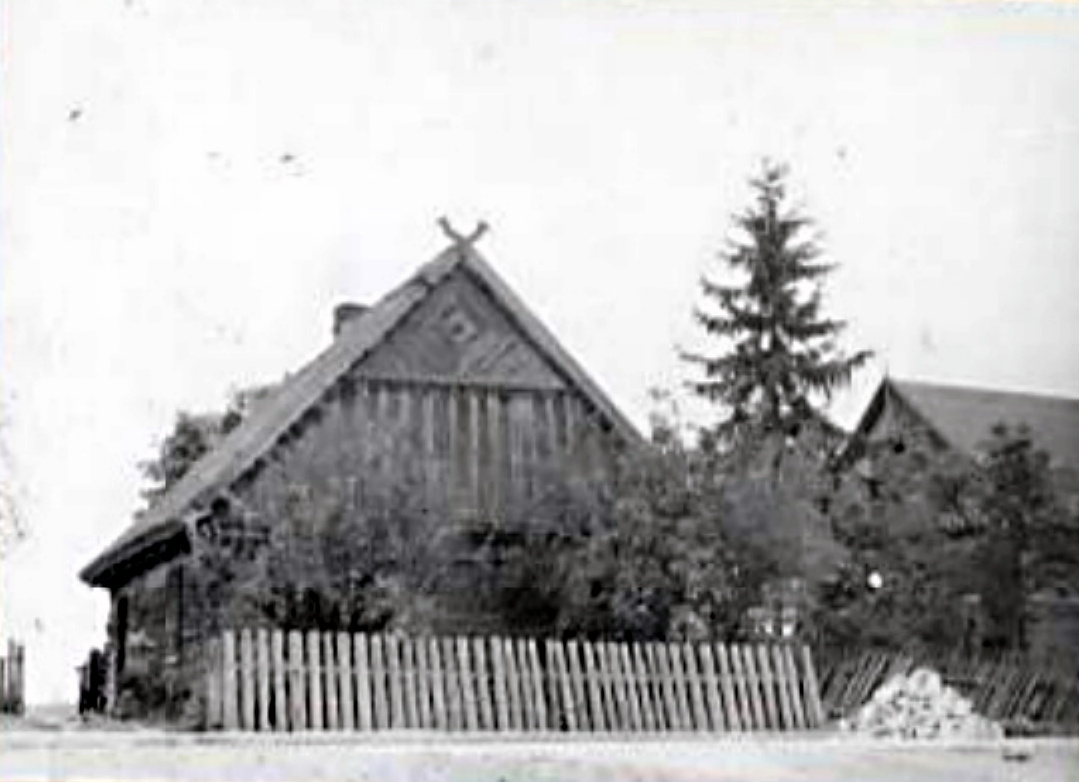
House with wooden beams from 1876 in the village of Porządzie

The area of Puszcza Biała and its local settlements were significantly influenced by the Narew and Bug rivers. The forest, which developed at the confluence of these rivers, came under the jurisdiction of the bishops of Płock in the 11th century, leading to its designation as Biskupia, Biskupizna, or Biskupszczyzna. The bishops initiated a systematic settlement campaign, which was interrupted in the 12th and 13th centuries by invasions from the Yotvingians, Prussians, Lithuanians, and Ruthenian tribes. Settlement efforts resumed in the 15th century, resulting in the establishment of numerous villages under Kulm law, particularly in the northwestern part of the forest. However, colonization in Biskupszczyzna faced setbacks due to wars and epidemics.

After the Swedish wars, Cossack invasions, and devastating diseases, Puszcza Biała experienced significant depopulation. This decline was especially influenced by political events from 1700 to 1721 and the plague, which was particularly severe between 1708 and 1709. In response, the bishops of Płock, starting with Andrzej Stanisław Załuski, sought to restore the forest and agricultural economy while also protecting the forest resources and generating income from local fauna and flora. They brought new settlers to the forest, specifically targeting residents from Puszcza Zielona who possessed expertise in forestry, such as honey hunters, tar producers, potash burners, hay gatherers, and hunters. The settlement campaign occurred between 1730 and 1790, with applicants undergoing a selection process; those who unlawfully attempted to clear the forest faced penalties. Settlers were granted permission to settle based on a bishop's privilege, the most famous being the privilege of Antoni Sebastian Dembowski concerning the settlement of Puszcza Biała, issued in 1748 in Pułtusk.

In the lustrations of the bishop's estates from 1773 and 1785, stored in the Diocesan Archive of Płock, there is a detailed list of villages settled by the Kurpie along with their surnames. They inhabited the villages of Grabówiec, Borsuki, Cieńsza, Ochudno, Lemany, Skłudy, Ponikiew, Tocznabiel, Pniewo, Trzcianka, Budy, Tuchlin, Poręba, Knurowiec, Przyjmy, Osuchowa, Białebłoto, Udrzynek, Przyjmy, Dudy Puszczańskie, Dudowizna, Wiśniewo, Małkinia Górna and Małkinia Dolna, Błędnica, Sumiężne, Laskowizna, Nagoszewo, Grabownica, Kuskowizna, Kacpury, and Ciuray. Some villages were completely populated by Kurpie (e.g., Nagoszewo, Osuchowa, Białebłoto), while others were mixed (e.g., in Trzcianka, of 23 homesteads, 11 in the eastern part were given to the Kurpie, while the rest in the western part were allocated to peasant serfs; in Pniewo, 6 peasant serfs worked in the manor, while 4 Kurpie lived on the parish land). There were fewer Kurpie settlers in the western part of Puszcza Biała (Lemany – 1 homestead, Tocznabiel and Czuraj – 2 each, Borsuki – 9, Grabowiec – 11, Cieńsza – 12). The Kurpie villages concentrated in the central part of the forest (Osuchowa – 49 homesteads, Nagoszewo – 37, Białebłoto – 24, Poręba – 23), although small settlements were also established here (Kacpury, Puzdrowizna – 2–4 settlers). The Kurpie came in whole families. Several surnames (Deptuła, Samsel, Ponichtera, Deluga, Zyśk, Najmoła) were repeated among the settlers. It was common for a father and sons or two brothers to start a new settlement together (e.g., in Tocznabiel – 2 brothers Lesiński; in Białebłoto – 4 Ponichterów). For example, the surname Ponichtera appears in the Ostrołęka and Łomża counties and more prominently in the Ostrów and Wyszków counties. Thus, it can be inferred that settlers from the central and eastern parts of Puszcza Zielona moved to Puszcza Biała, where the family expanded. From the surnames of the Kurpie settlers brought to Puszcza Biała, names of villages were created (e.g., from Adam and Piotr Dudów – the village Dudy, from Wojciech Kacpury – the village Kacpury, from Szczubełków – Szczubełkowo).

New settlers from Puszcza Zielona were brought to Puszcza Biała by the bishops of Płock under rental agreements, distinguishing them from the serf peasants who worked on church estates. In the 18th century, approximately 300 new settlers arrived in the region, resulting in the formation of four population groups: the Kurpie as rent-payers, peasant serfs occupying half or quarter voloks, smallholders, and cotters. The settlement of the Kurpie was conducted systematically. Initially, settlers occupied depopulated villages, followed by clearing overgrown areas and eventually settling on uncleared lands. The Kurpie were allowed to designate plots, which were measured by the bishop's forestry officials and subjected to taxation within six years. Rights to the land were formalized through contracts, which were inheritable within families. Before the official granting of deeds, settlers were exempted from rent and obligations to the bishops. The settlers from Puszcza Zielona brought with them honey-hunting privileges, which were recognized and respected by the bishops of Płock. Once granted, these privileges for settling in Puszcza Biała were reaffirmed by subsequent bishops. Despite these efforts, the population was not restored to its pre-catastrophe levels.

The local population benefited from the knowledge and skills of the Kurpie settlers, particularly in honey hunting, tar production, and charcoal burning. However, at the onset of the settlement process, there was a temporary shortage of resources as the Kurpie established their living and working conditions. This scarcity, nonetheless, stimulated the local market, leading to an increasing demand for food, handicrafts, and other goods.

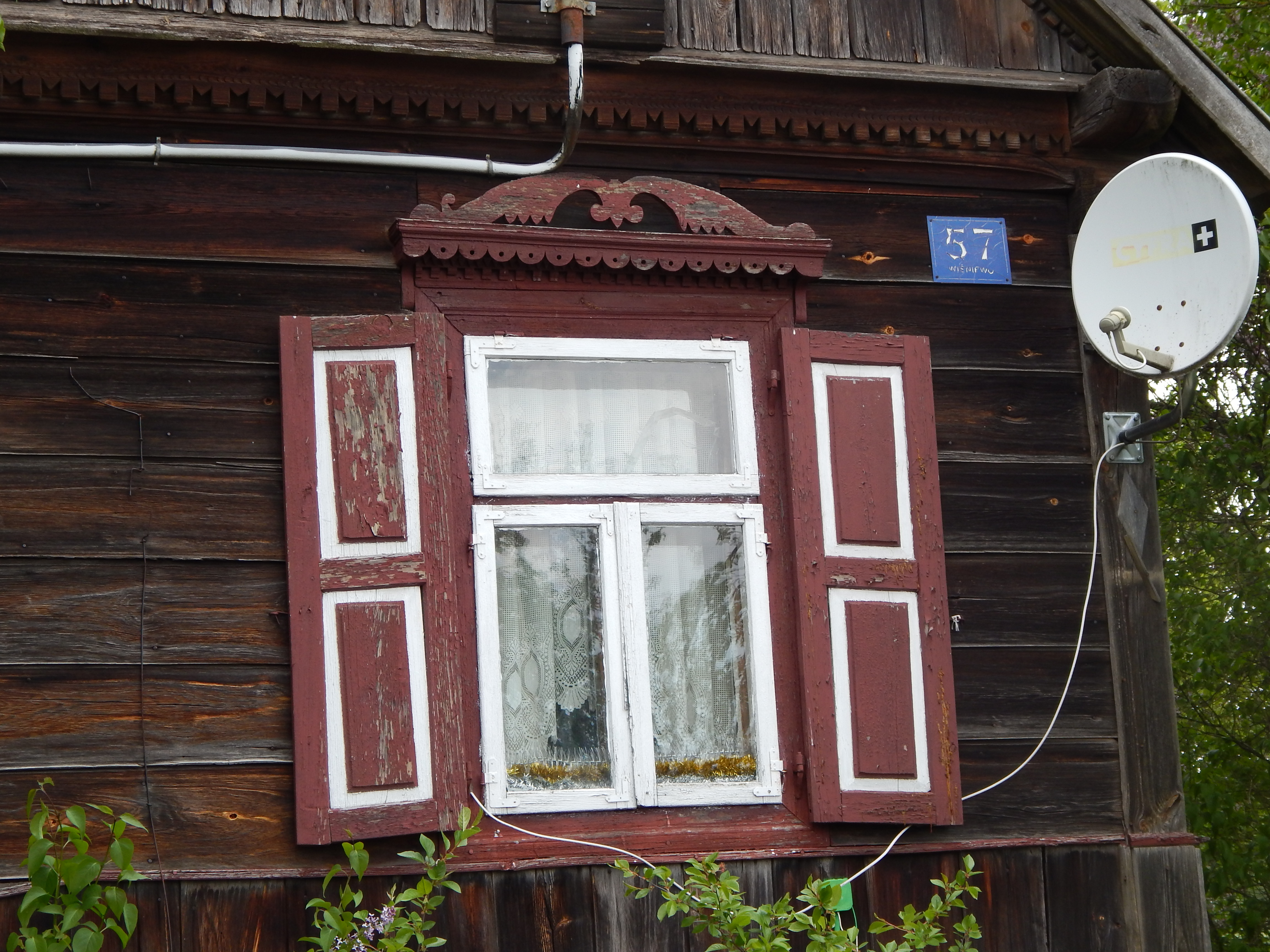
Window of a Kurpie hut in Wiśniewo

In 1795, following the third partition of Poland, the bishop's estates were secularized, marking the end of the Kurpie settlement campaign. The partitioning powers, focused on rapidly increasing agricultural and forestry production, engaged in predatory practices. During the Duchy of Warsaw, serfdom was abolished for peasants. In the Kingdom of Poland, efforts were made to impose rent on peasants in government (treasury) estates through a so-called colonial arrangement of villages. Actions were conducted based on laws from 1846 and 1848. In 1820, a plan was also adopted to reorganize forestry. The changes referred back to the actions of the bishops of Płock. The villages in the forest became "closed administrative units", where plots and areas for non-agricultural purposes were designated. Pastures and designated parts of the forest were commonly used. These actions led to the erasure of differences between peasant serfs (Gocie) and rent-payers (Kurpie). Remaining differences were eliminated by the enfranchisement ukases (1864), supplemented in 1868 and 1875. At that time, the landless and forestry workers received small plots, and servitudes were also introduced. In this situation, the Kurpie, working the land granted by the bishops in the previous century, had larger and more profitable farms than the newly enfranchised peasants, former serfs. The Kurpie were distinguished by their speech, some customs, and clothing. They likely maintained increasingly weaker contacts with the Kurpie from Puszcza Zielona. The Kurpie in Puszcza Biała were self-sufficient. In almost every village settled by the Kurpie, there was an inn, a school, and a smithy, and various craftsmen populated the village. The arrival of the Kurpie, a small influx of German (particularly in the post-swamp Pulwy on the Narew river), and Jewish populations, concentrating in artisan-trading settlements, did not dominate the population living in the forest for centuries, but it influenced the change in the socio-economic structure. Nevertheless, the Kurpie population from Puszcza Zielona, penetrating Puszcza Biała, brought with it a new culture that gradually influenced the indigenous population.

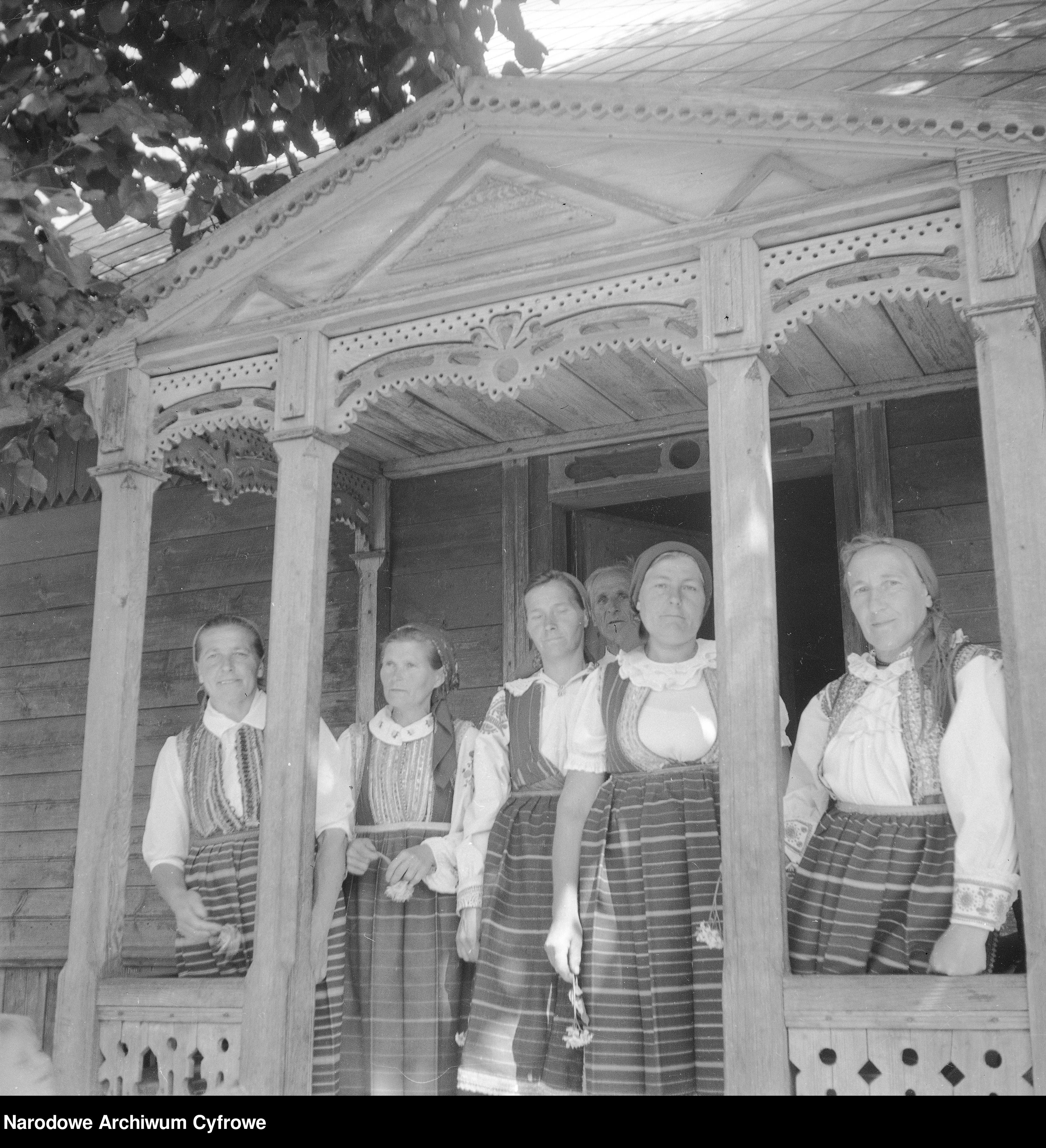
Kurpie women in the carved porch of a hut

The relocation of the Kurpie to Puszcza Biała necessitated a shift to more planned settlement patterns. The villages in the forest were organized as przysiółeks and linear settlements. In the 19th century, most of them were transformed into Zeilendorfs due to land reform and emancipation. The farmsteads were laid out in a rectangular plan, within which the house and outbuildings were constructed. The house always faced the road with its gable wall, close to which it was placed. At the back of the farmstead was a barn, with its front wall facing the house, sometimes featuring a so-called wystawka (a space for carts, sledges, and agricultural tools). On one side of the farmstead were the granary, woodshed, and pigsty, while on the other side were the cowshed and stable. Feed for horses and cattle was stored in the attics of the cowshed and stable. Chickens, geese, and ducks were raised. Grain and valuable agricultural tools were stored in the granary, straw stacks, and sacks. In the yard, a well was dug and a dugout, known as a śklep or parsek, was built. Next to it was a vegetable garden (sometimes also an orchard). The area beyond the yard, enclosed by a wooden fence, was called the gardens, where cows, horses, and geese were grazed. Sometimes this area was used for drying flax and linen. Hay barracks from the meadows were set up behind the barn.

By the first quarter of the 20th century, all buildings were constructed only of wood using timber-frame construction, mainly used for residential buildings, or with a post-and-plank method. Houses were built according to one of three types characteristic of Puszcza Biała. The first type was an asymmetrical wide-front building with an entrance on the side of the longer wall, built in a rectangular shape. Originally, these houses were single-room with a hall. Later, an additional room was added, which over time became a small chamber. Such houses were typical for small-scale farmers. The second type of house was a wide-front building with four rooms (a main room, a small chamber, a pantry, and a hall). This type developed from the first form under the influence of Kurpie settlement from Puszcza Zielona. In the interwar period, a third type of wide-front cottage appeared, which was constructed in the style of old serf houses. In this two-tract house, divided lengthwise by a hall into two parts on either side of the symmetry axis, two rooms were built. The entrance was from the road through an ornate porch to the hall and into the subsequent rooms, while the yard was accessed through the hall from the other side. After World War I, houses began to be built with cement blocks, which differed from traditional Kurpie construction. Life was centered in the most important room, the main room, which served residential, economic, social, and cultural functions, supported by its division into areas corresponding to these functions.

== Occupations of the population ==
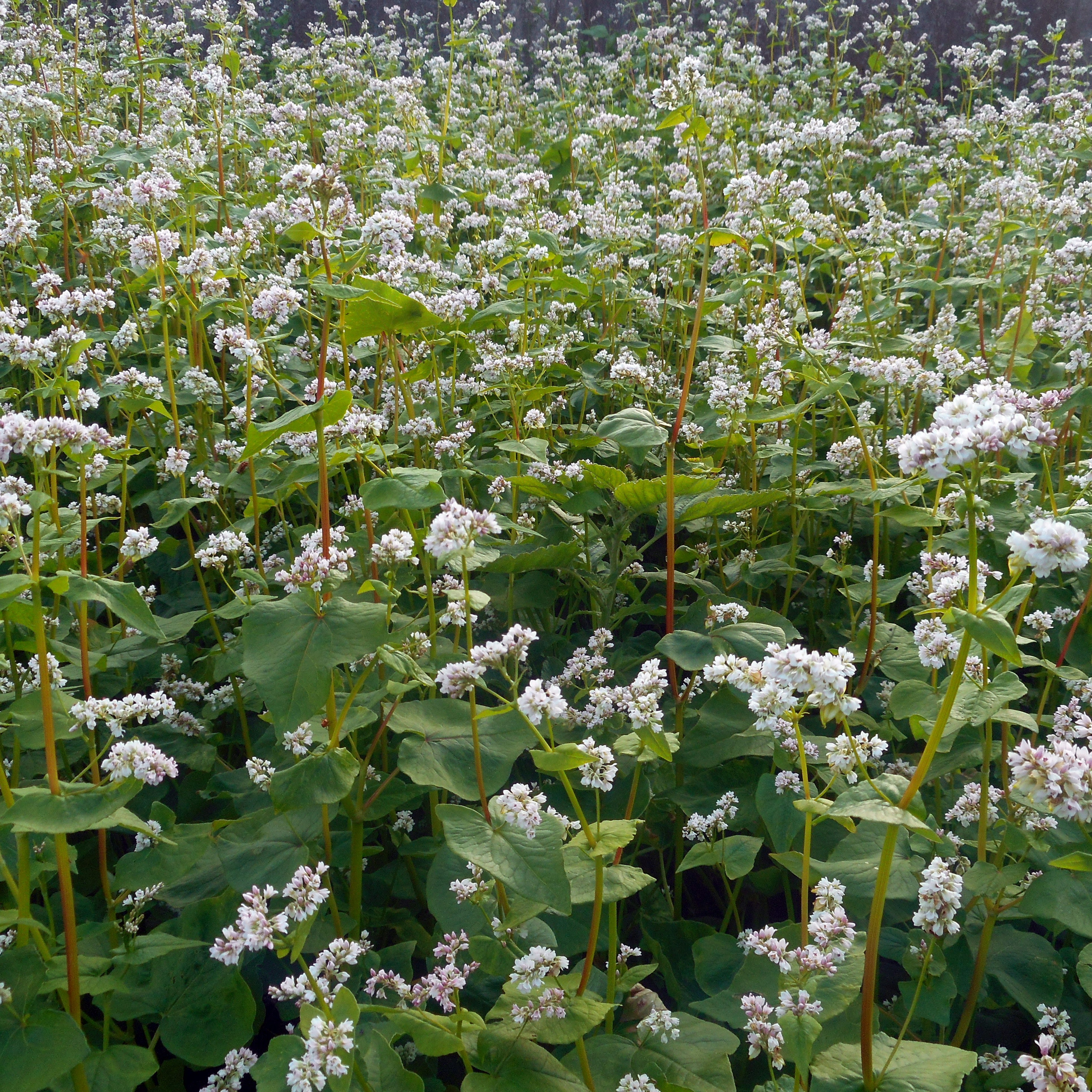
Buckwheat cultivated at the Maria Żywirska Open-Air Museum in Brańszczyk

In the Kurpie villages of Puszcza Biała, agriculture and animal husbandry predominated. Agricultural activities were concentrated in the Pułtusk group, located in the western part of Puszcza Biała, while forest-based activities, such as hunting, honey collection, ash and charcoal production, and tar-making, were prevalent in the Ostrów group in the eastern part of the forest.

In the eastern part of the forest, some of the population worked in tar kilns producing wood tar and charcoal. Small-scale farmers worked in potash factories, burning potash from wood ashes. Privileged beekeepers produced honey and wax, which were used for culinary, medicinal, and craft purposes.

In agriculture, the three-field system was popular, introduced after new arable lands were obtained from cleared forests. Until the end of the 19th century, fieldwork was done with a sokha and a primitive, wheelless plough with a long beam. The strength of oxen was used. Until the end of the 19th century, a ball yoke was used, and later, though less often, a throat yoke. After the emancipation of serfs, farmers continued to use ards and harrows, along with the sokha, which was replaced in the late 19th century by a blacksmith-made plow (ameryk). In the 1920s, it was replaced by a factory-made plow. Crop rotation practices emerged around the turn of the 19th and 20th centuries, along with improvements in agricultural tools that enhanced production efficiency. Major crops included rye, potatoes, buckwheat, flax, hemp, wheat, millet, oats, and barley, with root crops cultivated using a wooden plow that had an iron blade, later replaced by an all-iron version. After World War II, mechanical diggers were introduced, and wooden harrows gradually transitioned to iron and eventually to factory-made spring harrows.

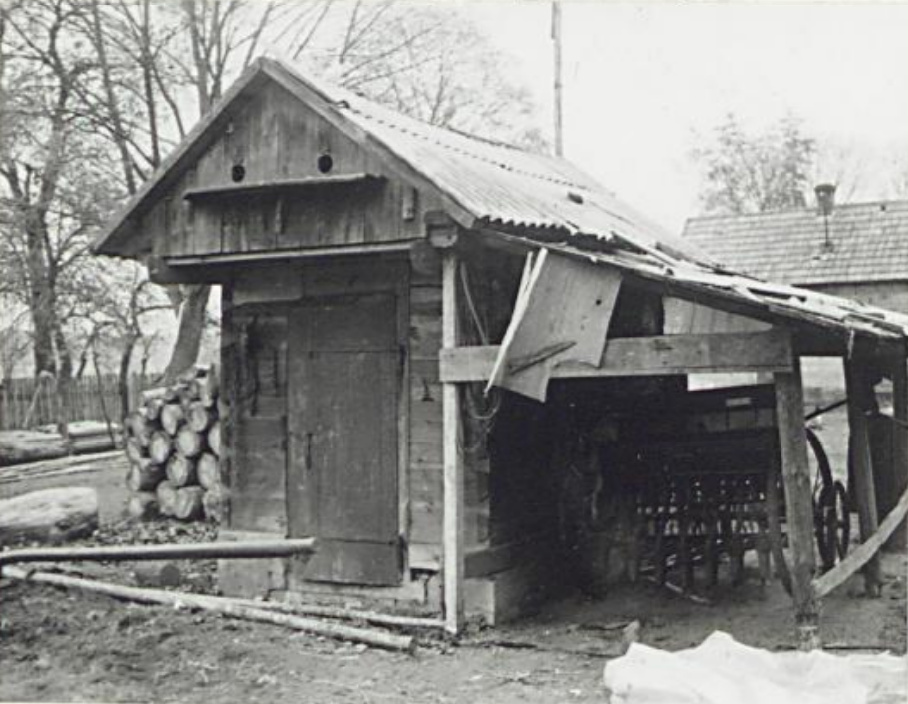
Granary from 1934 in Ochudna

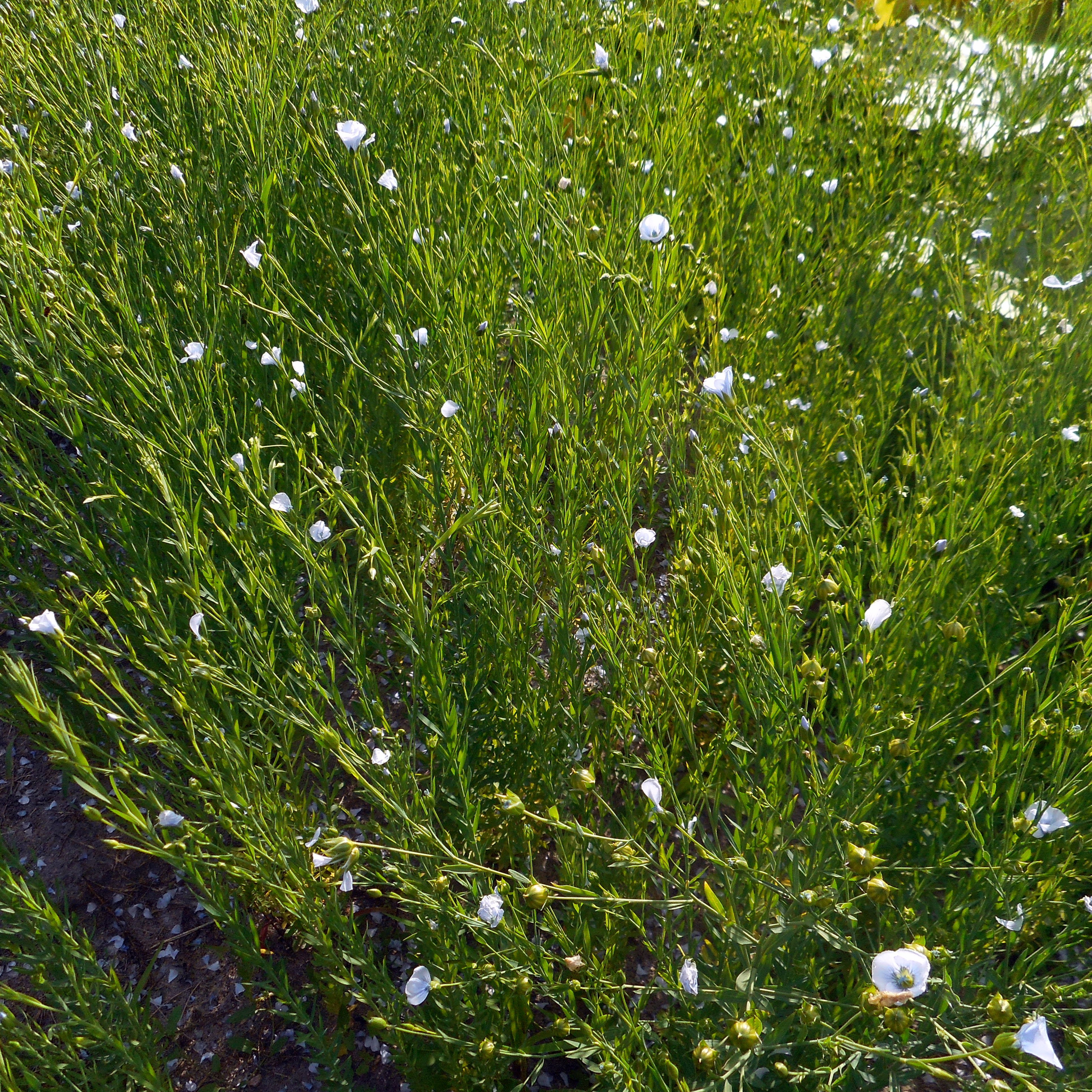
Flax cultivated at the Maria Żywirska Open-Air Museum in Brańszczyk

Agricultural tasks commenced in autumn with double plowing for sowing rye and winter wheat or harrowing to prepare the soil for spring sowing. In spring, the fields were fertilized with manure, silt, or peat mixed with animal dung. Subsequent plowing and harrowing were conducted before sowing, followed by additional harrowing to cover the seeds. The main harvest focused on rye, supplemented by smaller harvests of wheat, millet, oats, buckwheat, and barley. Harvesting was often a community effort, with neighbors assisting one another. The cut grain was gathered by hand using sickles, tied into bundles with straw, and left to dry before being stacked in small piles for later transport to the barn. Traditional celebrations, such as dożynki, and symbolic customs were upheld. Until World War II, grain was threshed with flails on the barn floor. Later, horse-powered devices were used to operate threshers and winnowers, eventually replaced by electric machines. After threshing, chaff was separated and added to fodder for cattle and pigs. The cleaned grain was stored in carved wooden bins, woven straw containers, and later in cloth sacks.

Using quern-stones and mortars, grain was processed: rye into flour, barley and buckwheat into groats, and millet into millet groats. Larger quantities of grain were milled in watermills. Until the end of the 19th century, oil was pressed from flaxseed or rapeseed in village oil presses. Tools like scythes and sickles were used for harvesting, and hoes for digging potatoes, with the harvest beginning in early September.

On the meadows, hay was collected to serve as winter fodder for the animals. Meadows, enriched by river silt, produced diverse and high-quality grasses. Haymaking, like other agricultural tasks, was often a communal effort, and the first windrow was in June, followed by a second in late August. The hay was cut with scythes, dried, and piled in haystacks in the meadows, then transported to barns before the first frost. By the early 20th century, hay was transported immediately after cutting and stored in stacks or hay racks behind farmhouses.

Animals grazed on marshy and riverside pastures, mown meadows, stovers, fallow land, and forest clearings, as well as in nearby enclosures. Close to the farmsteads, horses, calves, and poultry roamed.

Cattle raising was predominant, with cows and, until the end of the 19th century, oxen, along with pigs, sheep, horses, and poultry (chickens, ducks, and geese). At the turn of the 19th and 20th centuries, with the decline of oxen use, the number of horses and cows increased. After 1918, sheep farming declined in favor of cows and pigs. Consequently, the use of wool for homemade products also decreased, being replaced by ready-made materials from cities (such as cotton, wool, and yarn). In winter, animals were fed hay, chopped straw, and boiled potatoes mixed with bran. Horses also served dual purposes in farming and transportation.

An important branch of household work was weaving and processing wool, flax, and hemp. Flax was harvested in mid-August, after which it was threshed, soaked, and dried. The fibers were then processed using a flax brake and beaten with a flax mallet on wooden beams or stools. After being combed with wire brushes mounted on boards, different quality fibers were obtained. These fibers were spun into yarn on spinning wheels, and from the yarn, fabrics were woven on home looms for making bags, sheets, covers, shirts, aprons, bedding, and clothing. Hemp fibers were used to make ropes or halters. Hemp thread was woven into coarse linen for bags or thick sheets. In the spring or autumn, sheep were sheared, and the fleece was separated into strands and carded with iron brushes. Later, wool-carding machines became more common. Wool was spun on spinning wheels, and the threads were transferred to horizontal looms (weaving frames). Linen fabrics, linen-cotton blends, wool fabrics on linen or cotton bases, and woolen and yarn fabrics were produced. These were used to make bags, mattress covers, clothes, bedding, aprons, cloaks, towels, skirts, tablecloths, and more. More skilled weavers, and even some urban craftsmen, produced double-sided cloaks and double-warp carpets. The gradual decline of traditional folk attire coincided with the spread of factory-made fabrics from cities, although flax cultivation and weaving persisted until World War II.

Less common were rope-making, typically done by men and in small town workshops, and basket weaving, which required no specialized tools or skills. In wetland areas, willow, wicker, and reeds were gathered to weave baskets and chair seats, often a task for the elderly or poorer farmers. Baskets were also woven from the roots of pine, spruce, and juniper.

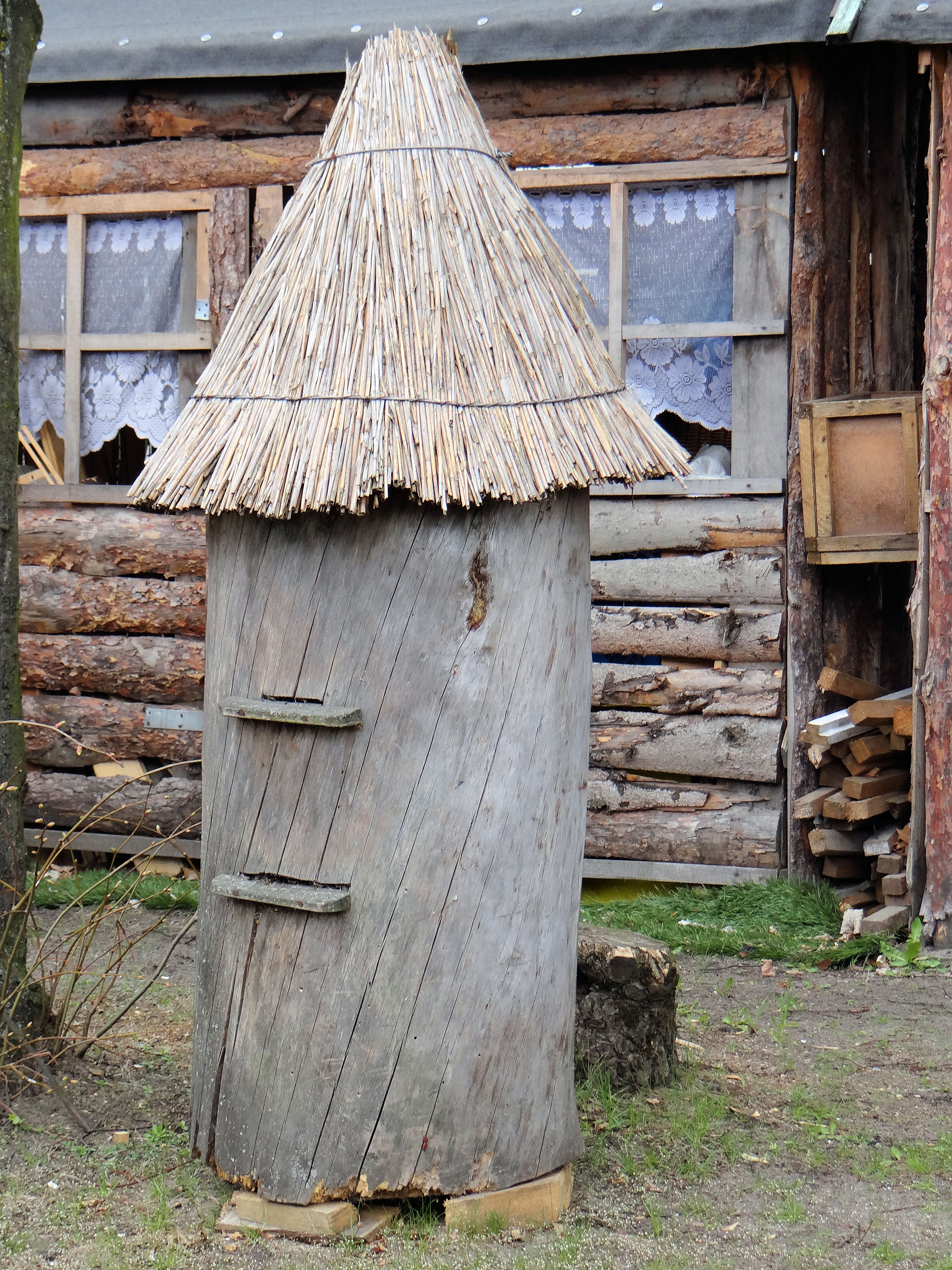
Log beehive at the Kurpie blacksmith shop in Pniewo

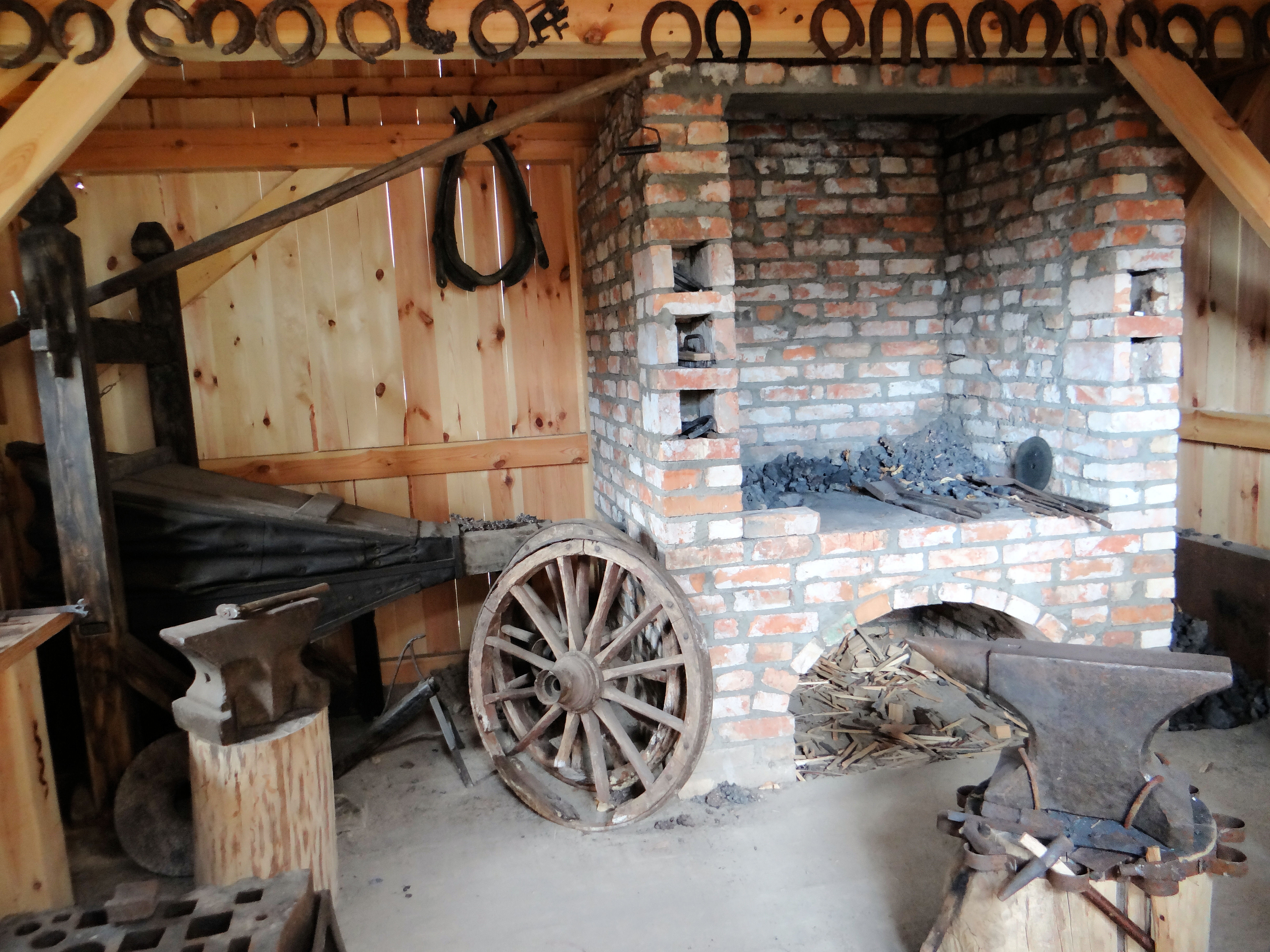
Interior of a blacksmith shop in Pniewo

After the decline of honey hunting in the first half of the 19th century, beekeeping became more common. Every farmer had several standing logs inhabited by bees, which were later replaced by box hives. Honey was harvested once a year, and wax was also collected.

Villages were home to blacksmiths, millers, innkeepers, coopers, carpenters, wheelwrights, potters, builders, and other craftsmen. For some, craftsmanship supplemented their agricultural and animal husbandry activities, while for others, it was the main source of livelihood. Smallholding farmers and rural poor often worked seasonally in non-agricultural tasks such as forest clearing, transporting wood, assisting wealthier farmers, and making farm tools. Thanks to this versatility, Kurpie villages in Puszcza Biała were largely self-sufficient. Most needs were met within the family or village, with specialized agricultural tools and ceramics being brought in from urban centers. These were produced in places like Pułtusk, Ostrów Mazowiecka, Wyszków, and Serock.

Fishing was an additional occupation, mainly for smallholding farmers living near rivers. They caught fish such as northern pike, common bream, ide, tench, asp, zander, European eel, and common roach, using various types of nets and self-made boats. In some villages situated near rivers, farming was combined with timber rafting. Due to the seasonal nature of the work, it was primarily done by landless or smallholding farmers. Rafting was most common in villages along the Bug river, where crews with helmsmen operated. This profession began to decline after World War I due to the destruction of the forest from the exploitative policies of the occupiers and the German invaders.

Family and social life were regulated by norms and behavioral patterns passed down from generation to generation, influencing the fulfillment of assigned roles based on age, gender, and social position. Men performed tasks that required more physical strength, such as farming, crafting tools and wooden items, building farmsteads, and doing repairs. Women also worked in the fields and tended to potato cultivation, hay collection, and processing flax and hemp. They managed the household, cared for the children, worked with livestock, and maintained gardens and orchards. Additionally, they engaged in home-based crafts like weaving, sewing, and creating decorations and ritual art. Women played a central role in raising children, with support from husbands and grandparents. In the early years of life, children stayed under the mother's care, gradually helping with household and farming tasks. Traditionally, children were responsible for herding cattle and poultry. Teenage girls learned all the domestic skills, while boys were prepared to run their farms by learning agricultural, animal husbandry, woodworking, hunting, fishing, and beekeeping skills. Grandparents contributed to lighter household tasks and passed down knowledge and traditions.

After World War II, many young people migrated to cities in search of new income sources outside of agriculture, leading to socio-economic transformations. Traditional ways of life changed, with new value systems diminishing the conservatism of earlier customs. Farming tools and equipment were modernized, and hand-made goods were increasingly replaced by factory-made products. The self-sufficient nature of village life began to fade, and long-standing relationships between its inhabitants weakened. In the second half of the 20th century, under the influence of the development of education, cultural centers, commercial and service networks, and mass media, individual thinking changed. People became more independent from the community, yet remained aware of their roots.

== Material culture and folklore ==
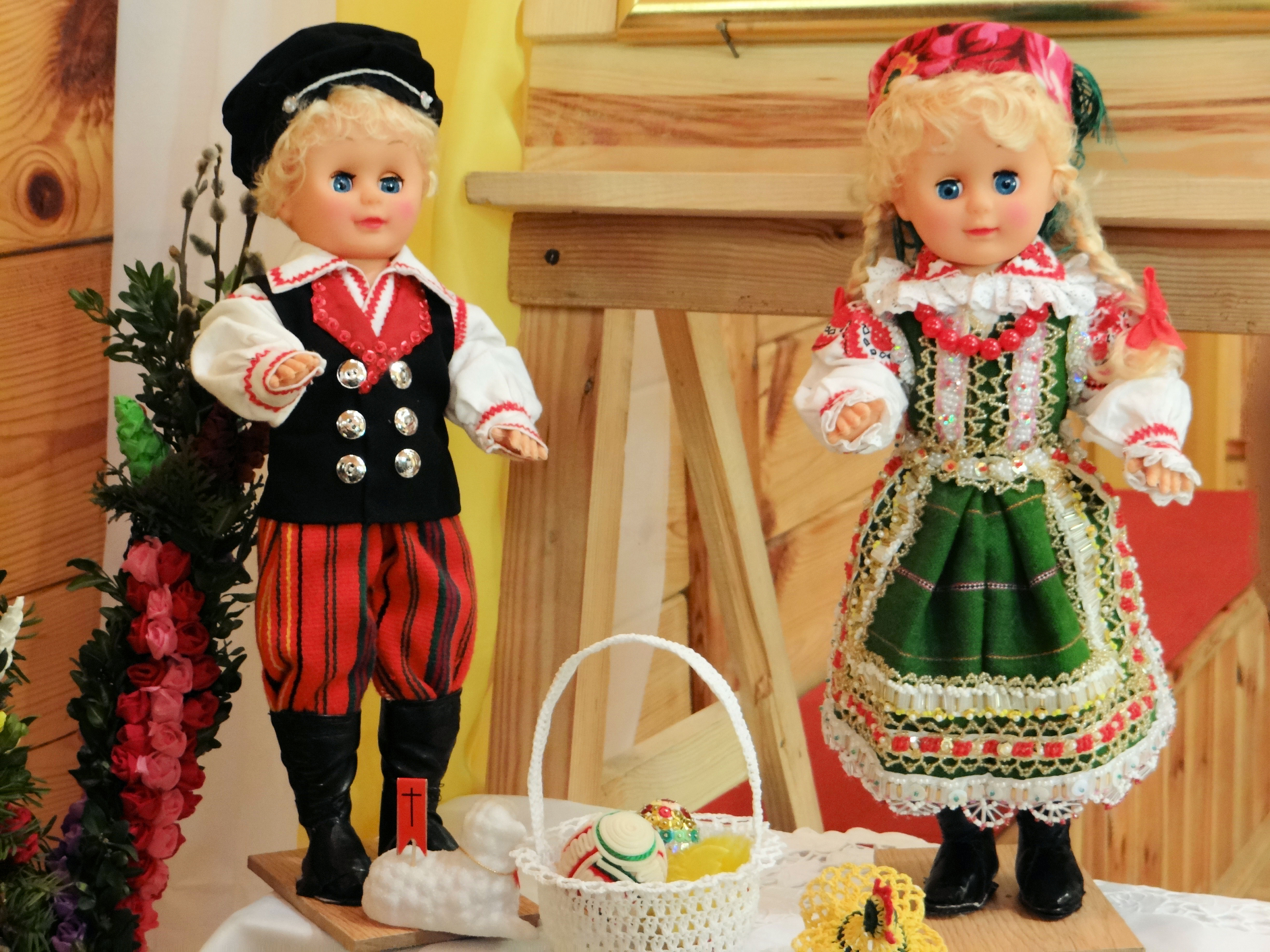
Dolls in Kurpie costumes from Puszcza Biała

Wincenty Szydlik argued that identifying Kurpie culture, which significantly enriched Kurpie Białe, solely with its material cultural products—such as cutouts, embroidery, and home decorations like straw mobile—represents a simplification of the phenomenon. Kurpie settlers, whether consciously or unconsciously, transmitted aspects of their material culture, including building and decorating techniques, to the indigenous forest population. They also shared elements of their spiritual culture, encompassing songs, rituals, customs, work ethics, and moral values, while simultaneously drawing influences from the local culture. It is noted that the Kurpie introduced a distinct hierarchy of values, emphasizing simplicity, kindness, and a strong sense of self-worth, which differed from the existing values in Puszcza Biała. The preservation of shared norms, attitudes, and behavioral patterns was supported by natural boundaries, including rivers, forests, and marshy areas.

=== Material culture ===
As part of craftsmanship and handicrafts, objects used in households were made, which also served decorative purposes. The most characteristic fields of folk art and handicrafts of Kurpie Białe are weaving, clothing, embroidery, sculpture, ceramics, construction, wickerwork, and ritual crafts.

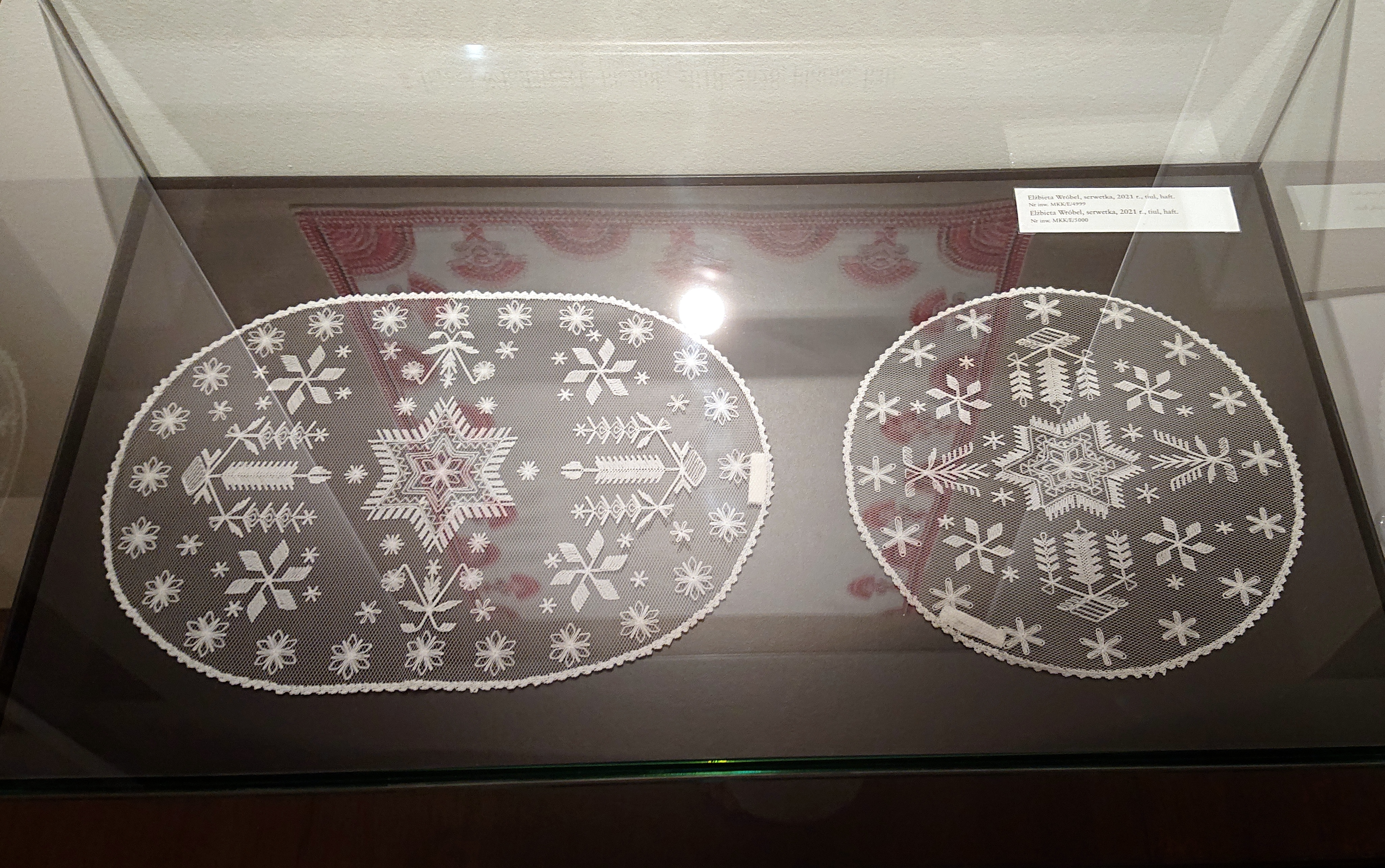
Doilies embroidered on tulle on display at the Hand Embroidery Exhibition in the Museum of Kurpie Culture in Ostrołęka

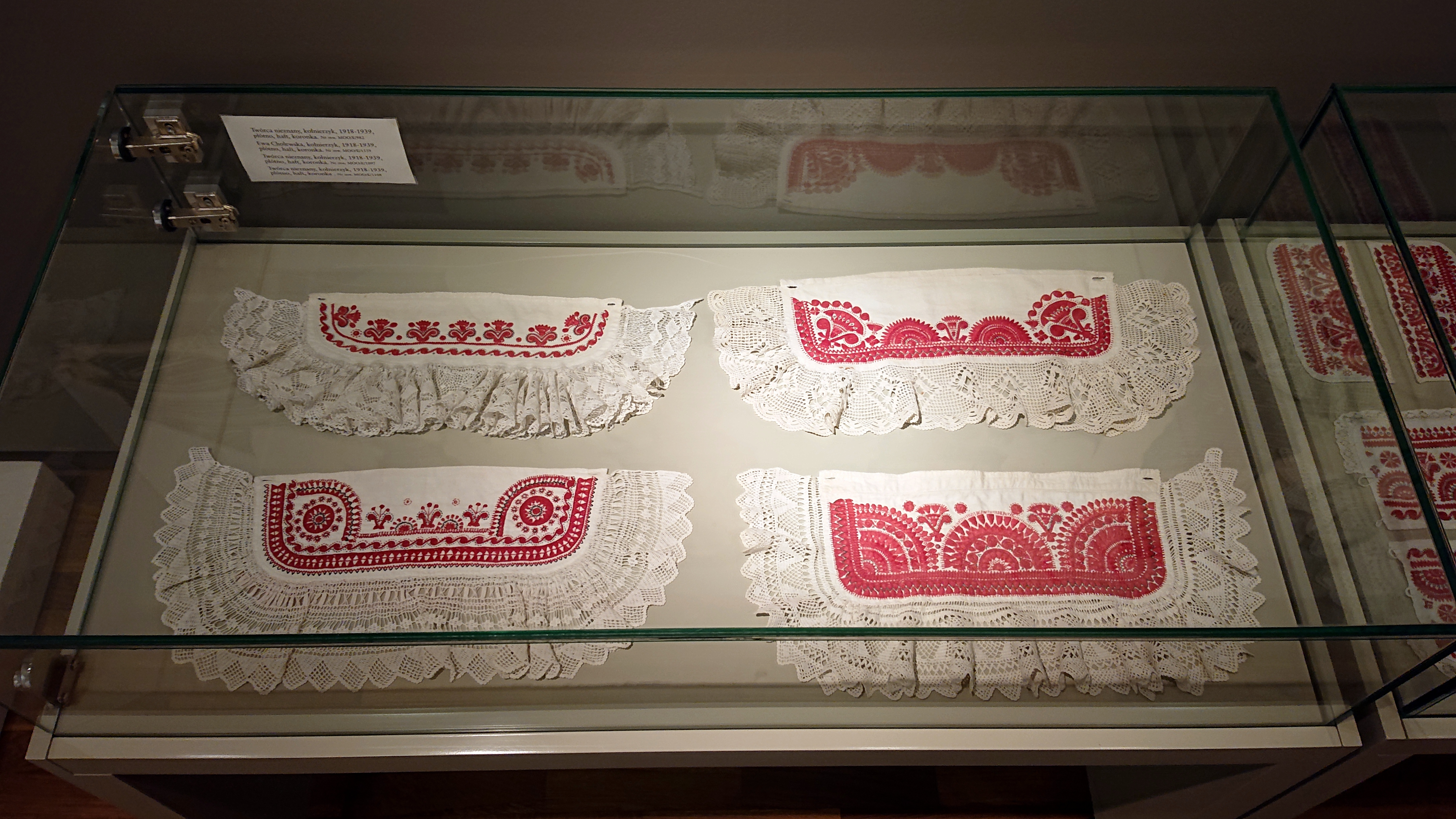
Embroidered collars on display at the Hand Embroidery Exhibition in the Museum of Kurpie Culture in Ostrołęka

Previously, weaving was a common craft among Kurpie Białe. Almost every home had a loom. Linen and wool fabrics were made in stripes and checks. In Puszcza Biała, the dominant color was green. Weaving was learned at home by observing older women. Linen fabrics were used for towels, and wool fabrics with a linen warp were used for skirts. Weaving was practiced by, among others, Teresa Jabłońska from Stary Mystkówiec and Anna Grzywacz from Nowe Wypychy.

Over time, the differences between the two parts of Puszcza Biała – Pułtusk and Ostrów – became more apparent, which was also reflected in their clothing. The latter was previously referred to as the Wyszków-Ostrów region.

Kurpie Białe women developed two types of embroidery: on tulle, called white, and colored on white or gray fabric using red and black mouliné thread. The white embroidery, with geometrized patterns subordinated to the material's structure (small borders, leaves, and stars), was done with white thread on cotton tulle and adorned caps. The red and black embroidery was used as decoration on traditional folk costumes. Over time, the patterns used on women's and men's shirts were transferred onto tablecloths and napkins. The following stitches were used: topstitch, eyelet, zigzag, and chain stitch. Patterns such as green shoots, semicircles, paws, dogs, and kuloski were created. The embroidery from Puszcza Biała gained recognition during the interwar period, and later thanks to Cepelia (Center for Folk and Artistic Industry). The cooperative ordered shirts, scarves, caps, and table accessories (tablecloths, napkins) from local artisans. Until the 1950s, they produced curtains, tablecloths, pillow inserts, sets of napkins, and decorative aprons for Cepelia. Embroidery allowed many families to sustain themselves. Embroiderers presented their work in museums, at fairs, and festivals. They were awarded and distinguished at both regional and national levels.

Sculpture is a branch of art that did not develop specific features in Puszcza Biała. The form and subject of the works depended on the artist's skill, sensitivity, and availability of materials.

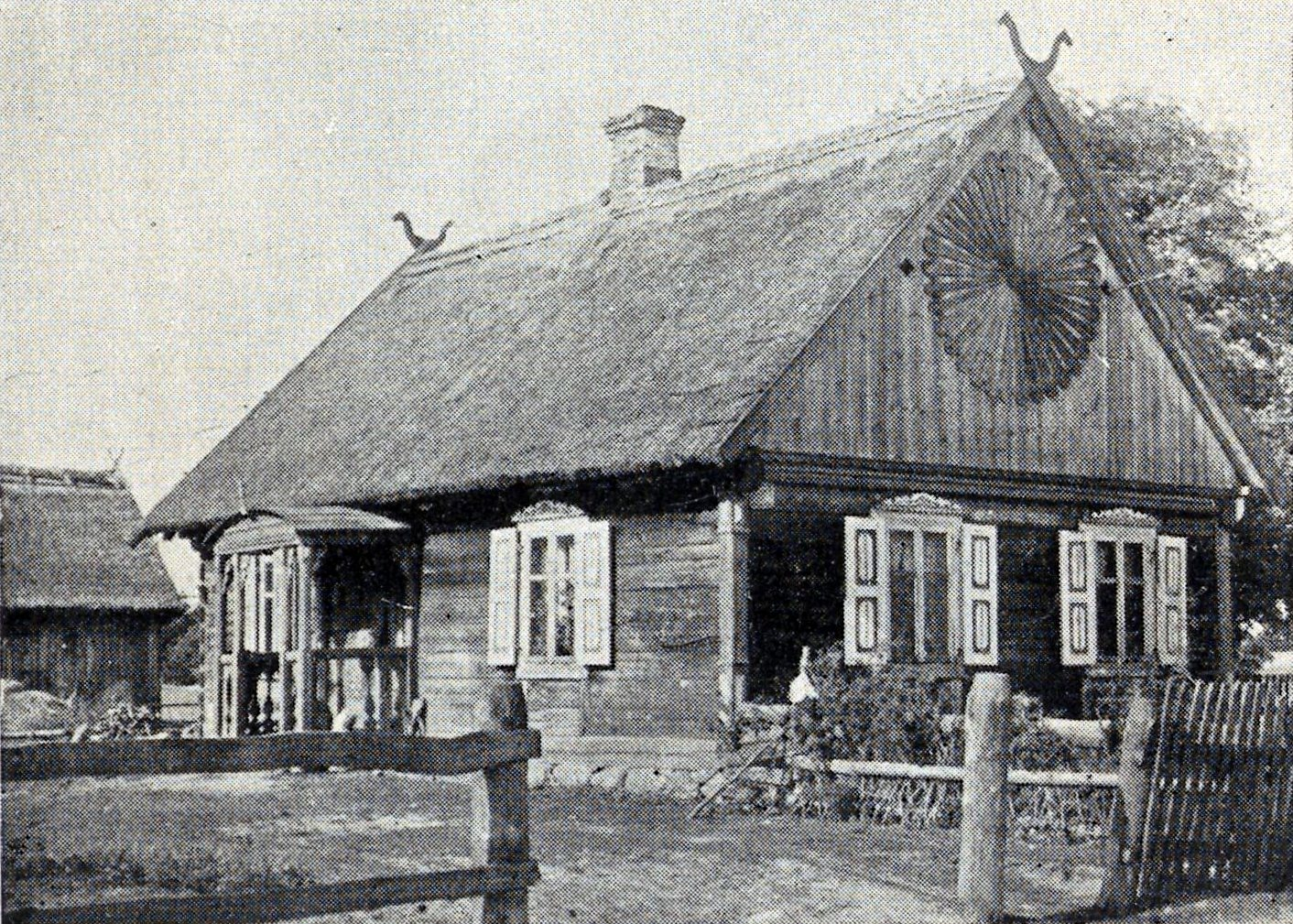
House in Dąbrowa before 1939

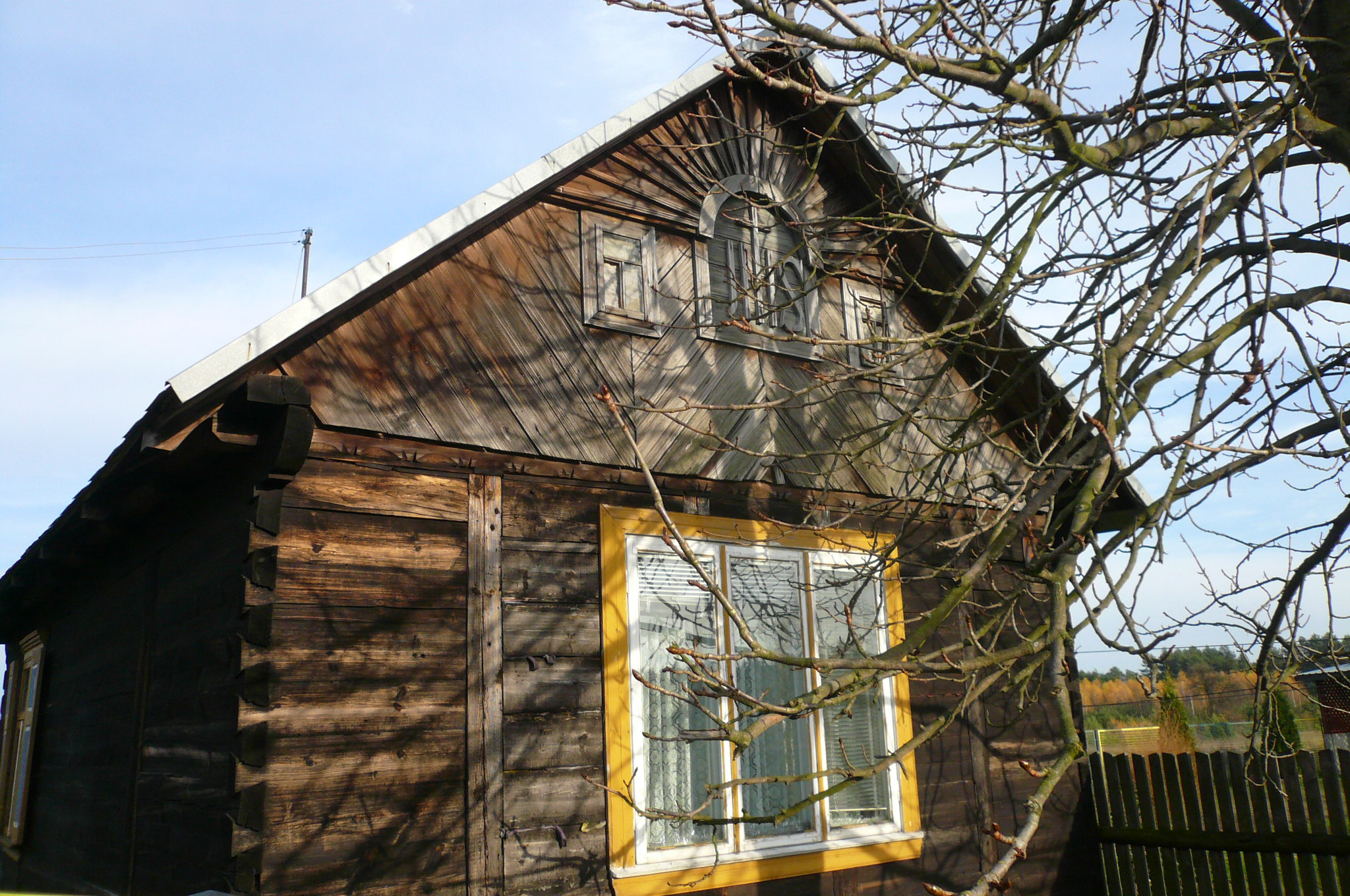
House gable in Sieczychy

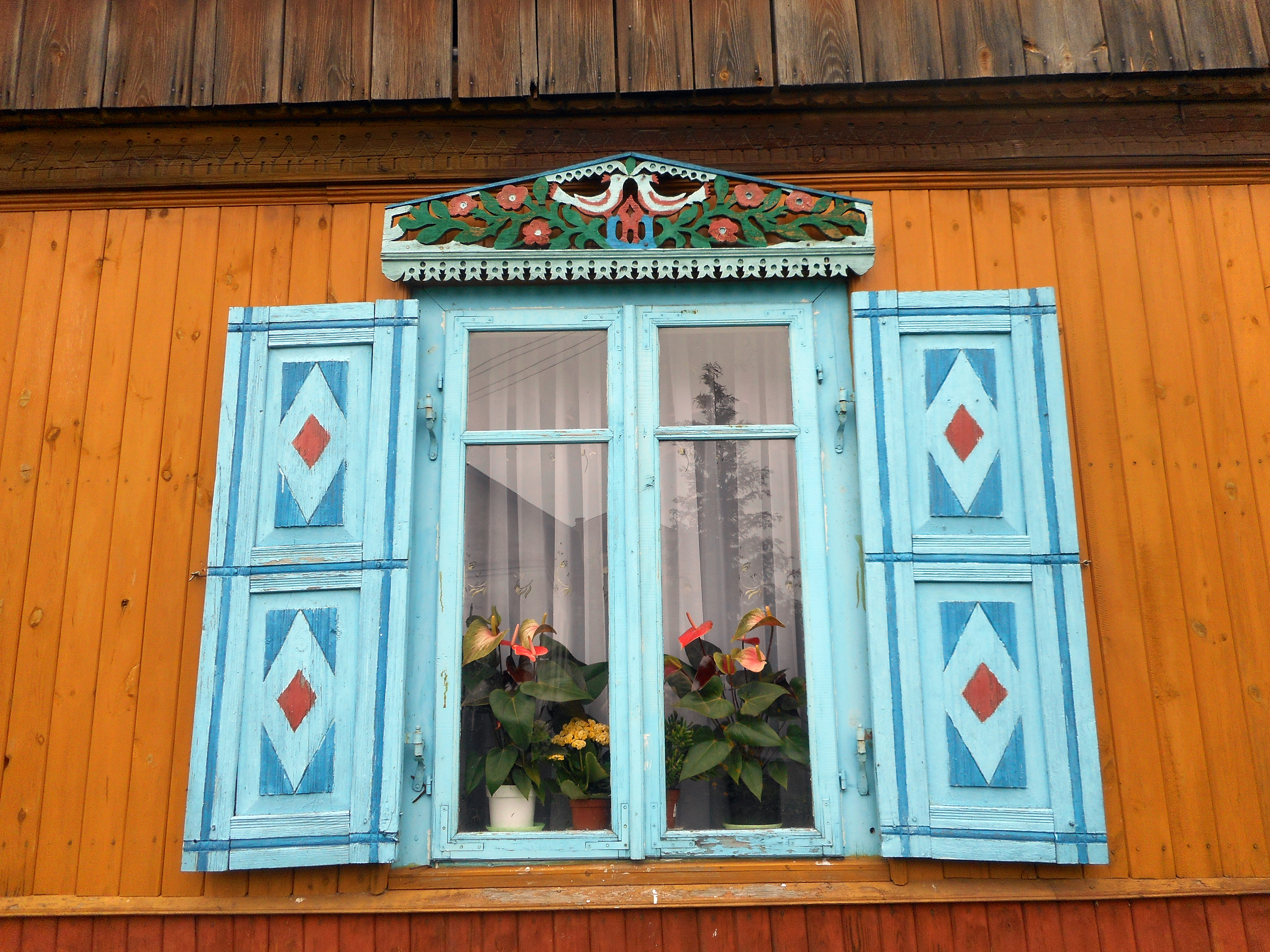
Window of a house in Rząśnik

Characteristic elements of the material culture of Puszcza Biała also included architecture and wooden decorations. When building a house, sill plates were laid on stones. Later, a base made of cement, bricks, or concrete blocks was introduced. The log walls were made from beams connected at the quoins using either the notch or dovetail joint technique. The quoins of the log structure and the gable wall extended slightly beyond the face of the house. Their ends were decoratively profiled. The roofs were gable, constructed using a rafter system, and covered with straw. After 1918, larger houses began using posts to support the rafters, influencing changes in the gable decorations. Several pairs of thin crossed poles were placed on the roof ridge. After 1918, roofs began to be covered with shingles or wood chips. Wealthier farmers used roof tiles. Doors and windows were fitted into pre-prepared openings, cut into the house's frame. They were often set in posts, combining the log structure with the post-and-plank construction. Initially, double-leaf windows with 4 or 6 panes were used. In the early 20th century, two- and three-part windows became common. In three-part windows, a small transverse window at the top could be opened. Doors were single-leaf, made of double layers of boards. They were decorated with strips of wood laid in geometric patterns and studded with nails with large heads. In later-built wide-front houses, the doors were double-leaf, made of panels, decorated, and painted. As it became harder to obtain wood, houses were built with thinner wood, which made them less warm and caused them to become damp more quickly. Therefore, houses began to be weatherboarded. In the early 19th century, rich house decorations appeared. The peak of this art was in the 1930s. Carved decorations covered the corners, cornices above and below the windows, roof gables, windbreaks, doors, and porches, and were extremely diverse. The gable wall of the house was the most decorated, as it was the representative part. Gables were decorated with boards laid in various geometric patterns: diamonds, triangles, squares, and herringbone. The perforated boards protecting the external roof covering (windbreaks) at the point of intersection on the ridge took the form of śparogi. They resembled horse, ram, or bird heads, or animal horns. The lacy cornices above the windows were called korunamy. When wide-front houses appeared, with the longer wall facing the road, porches began to be richly decorated.

The interior decor depended on the wealth of the household. Initially, all items were made by the farmers themselves, but over time, furnishings were enriched with the products of village or small-town artisans. Local fairs and markets served this purpose. Items were decorated with popular patterns. The furnishings included a chest, later a trunk, in which festive clothing, linen, napkins, fabric supplies, ornaments, devotional objects, documents, and money were kept. The rooms contained cupboards for dishes, stools, small chairs, and tables, made by the farmers or a village carpenter. In the mid-19th century, in the western part of Puszcza Biała (the Pułtusk group), chairs made in towns became common. Their seats were woven from swamp reed called rokicina. In wealthier cottages, there were chests of drawers, sideboards, and wardrobes. The bedroom had beds and ślabany (narrow benches with a backrest and a chest, whose lid served as a decorated and profiled seat).

The interiors of rooms were decorated with paper flowers and compositions made from dried and often dyed grains, herbs, and flowers. These were mainly used to decorate the so-called icon corner, placed near holy figures and images. Small flowers made from thin paper were attached to the wire. Constructions made from paper flowers and straw were also created to cover damaged picture frames.

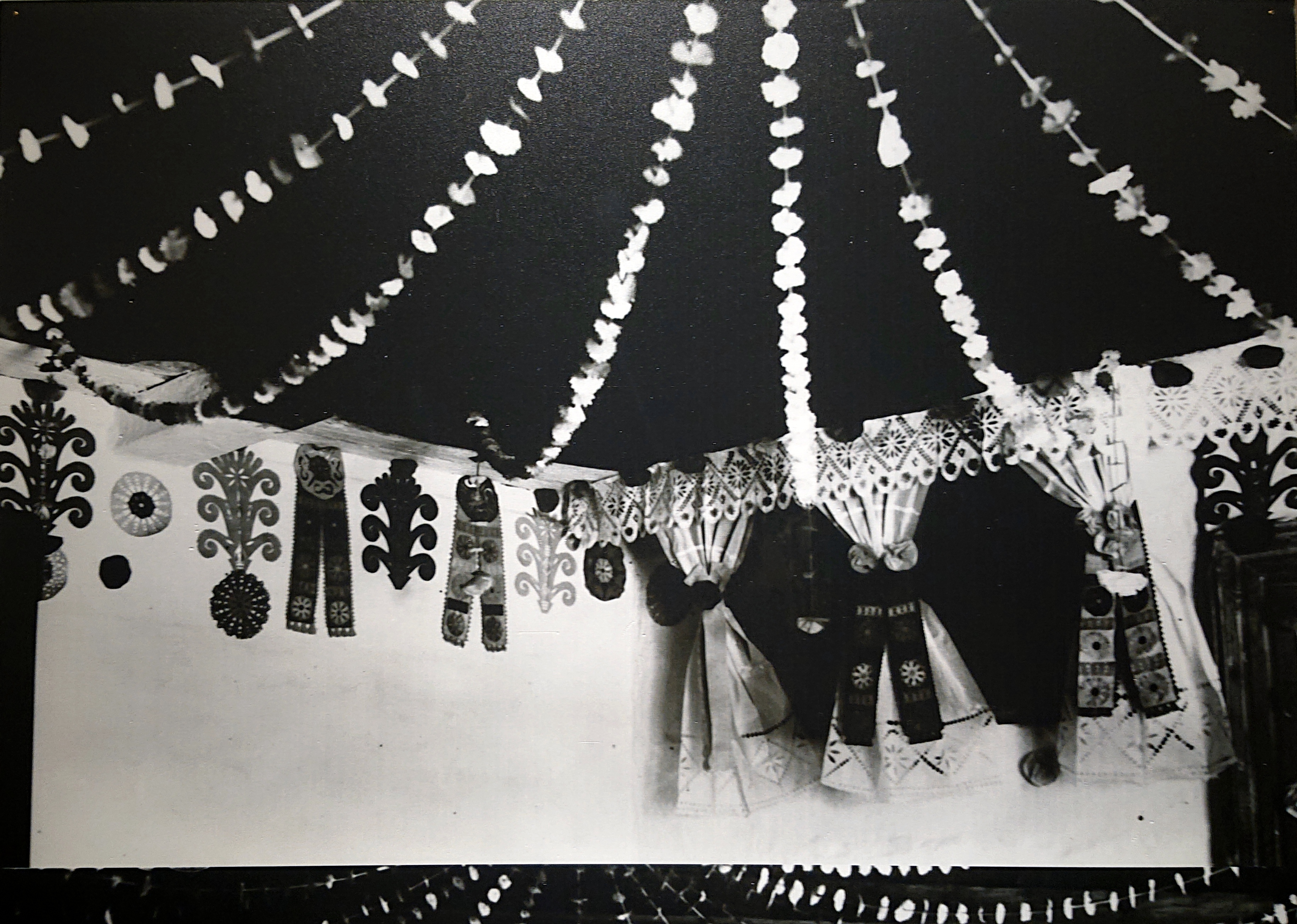
Cottage in Puszcza Biała decorated with paper cutouts and a straw mobile

The rooms were decorated with paper cutouts. Artists from Puszcza Biała, especially active in the villages of Dąbrowa and Pniewo, created these crafts for personal use and sold them only to local buyers. This helped preserve the traditional forms and original function of the cutouts. Two categories of paper cutouts from Puszcza Biała can be distinguished: monochromatic (often in the form of zielka) and colorful nalepianki in the shape of circles. Another form typical of Kurpie Białe is a ribbon-like nalepianka called portki. Figurative compositions also exist. The dominant colors were red, green, and yellow. The art of paper cutting saw a revival in certain communities after World War II with the support of Cepelia; however, after its collapse, individual artists struggled to maintain the tradition.

In the field of ritual art, the oklejanki (Easter eggs decorated with rushes and embroidery floss) are notable. This type of decoration has been or is still being practiced by Halina Witkowska from Lemany, as well as Maria Chmielewska and Julianna Puławska from Pniewo-Kolonia. Easter palms are also made from bilberry branches, pussy willows, reeds, and paper flowers. For harvest festivals, wreaths are crafted from dried grains, flowers, and ornamental grasses, sometimes dyed. These compositions are adorned with patterns from Kurpie Białe embroidery, along with depictions of saints, decorated with garlands of rowan berries, fruits, and vegetables. Before Christmas, dolls, angels, and flowers were created from paper, cotton wool, and glue. Multicolored flowers were hung on Christmas trees, along with accordion-folded paper chains interwoven with straw. During the Christmas season, straw mobile made of straw and paper were crafted and hung from the ceiling. Julianna Puławska was involved in this work, later followed by her student Halina Witkowska.

=== Dialect ===
The Kurpie dialect in Puszcza Biała is similar to the dialect from Puszcza Zielona and belongs to the Mazovian dialects. It is characterized by a specific pronunciation style known as mazuration, szadzenie, and ciakanie, as well as asynchronous articulation of soft labial consonants (p', b', f', w', m') and their softness at the end of words, which leads to the use of terms like pśwo, bźały, źater, Kurpś, and scaź.

There are also differences in inflection, which manifest in the accusative singular of feminine nouns (e.g., zawołaj gospodynią, wystrojiła sia w nową suknią), the genitive singular of masculine nouns (e.g., nie z tego brzega, zleciał ze stoła), grammatical gender changes (e.g., więzień instead of więzienie, brzytew instead of brzytwa), the dative singular of masculine nouns (e.g., dzieciakoju instead of dziecku, psoju instead of psu), the instrumental plural (e.g., rękamy, nogamy, pazuramy, jile to roboty z teni dzieciani), the first-person plural (e.g., przejdziem, jidziem), and the second-person plural (e.g., kręcita sia, zbierajata sia, jak mata, to dajta).

There are also lexical peculiarities, which are words specific to this area, such as wardęga (cattle, livestock), sigać (to throw), and usamotać (to tame), as well as borrowings from German (e.g., sipa – a type of shovel, glaca – baldness, szperać po kątach, śuber – illegitimate child, reja – a long and shallow pit for potatoes) and Russian (e.g., wsio, podchodzi instead of pasuje, chadziaj, sobaka).

== Kurpie Białe in scientific research and social awareness ==
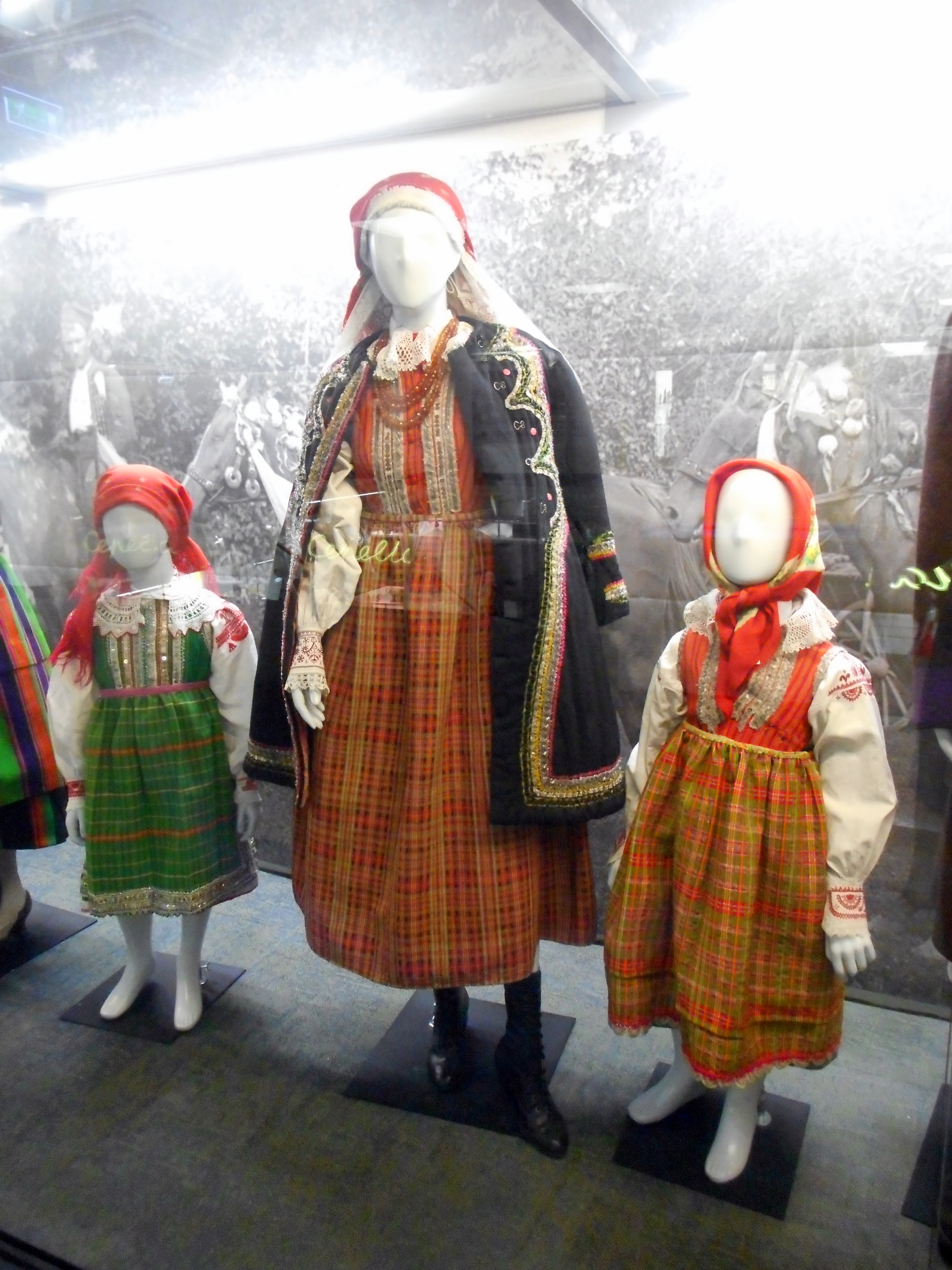
Kurpie outfits from Puszcza Biała at the State Ethnographic Museum in Warsaw

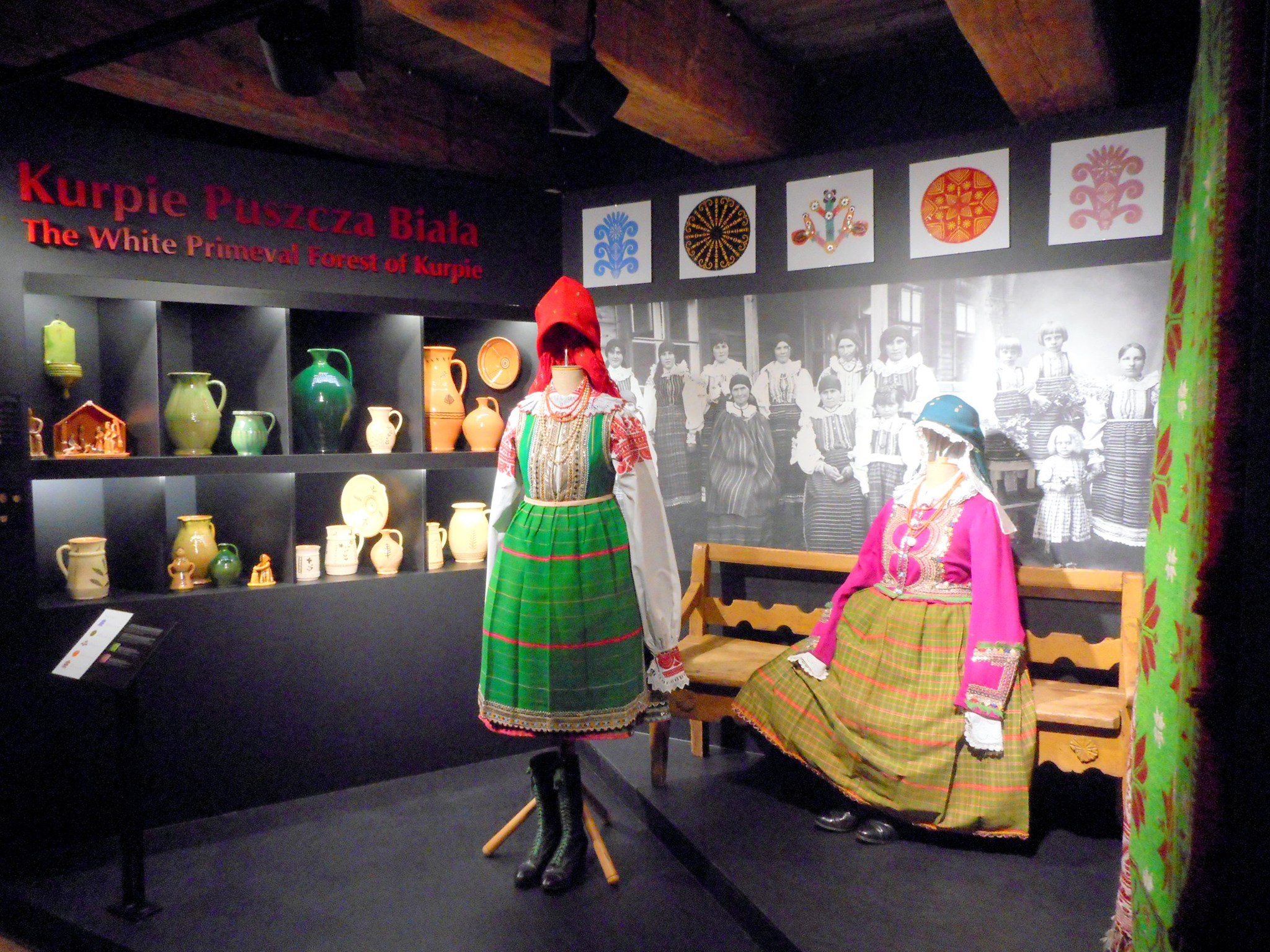
Exhibition dedicated to Kurpie Białe at the Mazovian Museum in Płock

In 1842, Kazimierz Władysław Wóycicki wrote about Kurpie Białe living in Puszcza Biała. Oskar Kolberg also mentioned Kurpie Białe, presenting customs observed in villages such as Białebłoto, Długosiodło, Ochudno, Porządzie, Pniewo, and Przetycz. Adam Chętnik and Ludwik Krzywicki also wrote about Kurpie Białe from Puszcza Biała, although they did so on the margins of their studies on Puszcza Zielona. Zygmunt Gloger's Geografia historyczna ziem dawnej Polski (Geography of Historical Lands of Ancient Poland) from 1900 includes a mention of Puszcza Biskupia and its boundaries. Adam Fischer noted that Kurpie Białe inhabited two forests: Zielona and Biała. During the interwar period, Janina Orynżyna, Helena Schrammówna, and Józef Grabowski studied the folk art of Kurpie Białe.

Since the early 20th century, postcards featuring elements of material culture (such as traditional outfits and paper cuttings) or views of Puszcza Biała and the architecture of nearby towns were published, increasing social awareness of the existence of Kurpie Białe. The popularization of the folk culture of Kurpie Białe was also supported by exhibitions, many of which were organized in Pułtusk, such as in 1929 and 1949.

Even before World War I, efforts were made to collect the material culture of Kurpie Białe for research and exhibition purposes. Ethnographic materials were gathered by Jadwiga Wierniewicz from Obryte, and during the interwar period, by figures such as Maria Żywirska and Wanda Modzelewska. Their collections were destroyed during World War II.

During the interwar period, there was an increased interest in elements of traditional culture, which supported existing patterns and helped prevent their decline. This interest was fueled by the establishment of ethnography departments at Polish universities and the creation of maps of ethnic groups at that time. Kurpie Białe appeared in ethnography textbooks. They were mentioned by Kazimierz Moszyński in Kultura ludowa Słowian (Folk Culture of the Slavs), and after World War II, by Józef Gajek, who oversaw the creation of Polski Atlas Etnograficzny (Polish Ethnographic Atlas). Research on Kurpie Białe was conducted by ethnographers from various academic institutions, including the Department of Ethnology and Cultural Anthropology at the University of Warsaw and the Department of Ethnography at the University of Łódź, as well as students participating in Inter-University Ethnographic Camps.

In the post-war period, the history and culture of Kurpie Białe were described in general studies concerning folk art and crafts, especially in Polska Sztuka Ludowa (Polish Folk Art). Information about Kurpie Białe living near Brok appeared in Jan Bystroń's Etnografia Polski (Ethnography of Poland). Zofia Chrzanowska mentioned the history of Puszcza Biała in a text published in 1961 in Literatura Ludowa (Folk Literature). Among post-war researchers of Kurpie Białe, notable figures include Wanda Modzelewska, Roman Reinfuss, Eugeniusz Frankowski, Zofia Cieśla-Reinfussowa, Aleksander Błachowski, and Anna Damroszowa. The most important researcher and popularizer of the history and culture of Kurpie Białe was Maria Żywirska. She presented her research results in scientific articles and, in 1952, published a volume on the Kurpie outfit from Puszcza Biała as part of Atlas Polskich Strojów Ludowych (Atlas of Polish Folk Costumes). In 1973, she published a monograph summarizing her years of research conducted even before World War II. Her publication Puszcza Biała. Jej dzieje i kultura (Puszcza Biała. Its History and Culture) is the only monograph fully portraying the history and development of settlement in Puszcza Biała. By presenting a comprehensive picture, Żywirska initiated a series of works dedicated solely to this region and its inhabitants.

A notable development for the material culture of Kurpie Białe, as well as an opportunity to showcase their crafts to a broader audience, came with the establishment of a women's cooperative in Gładczyn in 1936. The cooperative was organized by Wanda Modzelewska. In 1938, the Kurpie Cooperative of Folk Industry was officially registered. The supervisory board included Wanda Modzelewska, Zofia and Jan Rostafiński, parson Konstanty Lewandowski, and embroiderer Marianna Pogłód. The cooperative included women from Puszcza Biała who specialized in embroidery, weaving, paper cutting, and egg decoration.

In 1947, the cooperative was reorganized in Pniewo as part of the Peasant Self-Help Union. Stefania Urlich served as president until 1970. When Cepelia was established in 1949, the Pniewo cooperative joined the Union of Folk and Artistic Handicraft Cooperatives Cepelia. It was the oldest of over 100 cooperatives within the union. Its primary task was to preserve folk crafts by developing product designs and finding markets for folk creations. Initially, the cooperative focused on the marketing of Kurpie embroidery from Puszcza Biała. In 1956, the cooperative was moved from Pniewo to Pułtusk, where pottery production began, and textiles were crafted at home. The cooperative's products were based on traditional patterns from the Pułtusk and Wyszków counties. The ceramics department was organized in workshops in Pułtusk and Wyszków. Weaving was developed in Dąbrowa and Porządź, producing goods according to Cepelia's patterns with specific dimensions for table runners, bedspreads, or folk costumes. Embroidery was prominent in Cieńszy, Pniewo, Komorowo, Mystkowiec, Wielątki, Rząśnik, and Wólka. The cooperative also dealt with wood carving and paper cutting. Members were employed within the cooperative, which operated a home-based production system and a free collection. It supplied creators with materials and necessary items. Later, workshops for tapestries, sumaks, and kilims, as well as garment production, were established. The cooperative employed graduates from vocational schools in Pułtusk. In 1973, it was registered as the Cooperative of Folk and Artistic Handicraft Twórczość Kurpiowska in Pułtusk. Between 1972 and 1990, its president was Mieczysław Waleśkiewicz, followed by Maria Kozon, and Ewa Wiercicka served from 1990 to 1991. The cooperative organized exhibitions and competitions, representing the region at fairs and folk art markets both domestically and abroad. The most outstanding and award-winning creators could join the Association of Folk Creators. The cooperative collaborated with museums and school art centers, offering subsidies, scholarships, and assistance to creators. It dissolved in 1991. Remaining handmade products were transferred to the Museum of Mazovian Nobility in Ciechanów and the Museum of Kurpie Culture in Ostrołęka. The end of institutional support for the folk art of Kurpie Białe contributed to its decline.

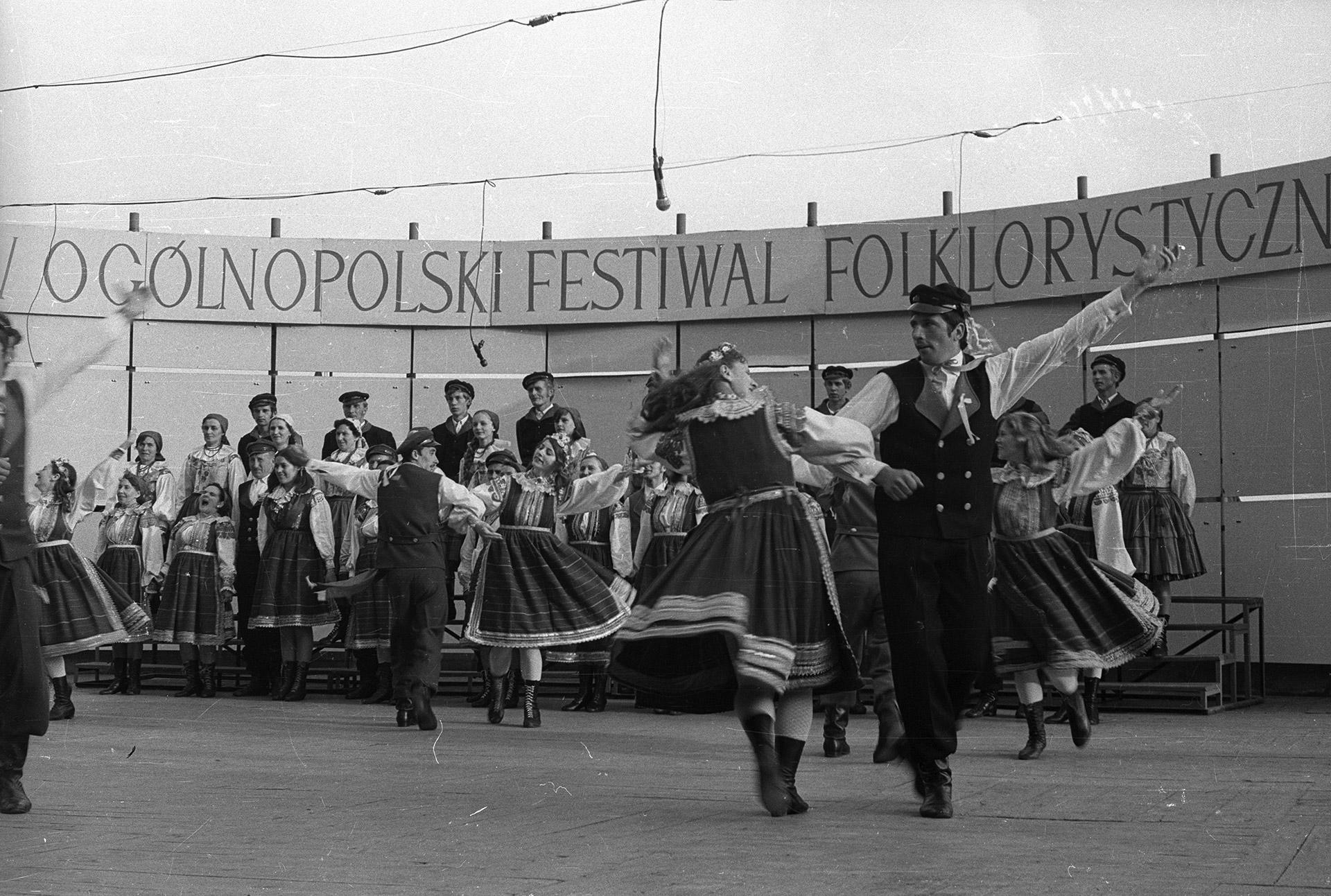
Puszcza Biała Song and Dance Group from Obryte at the 5th National Folklore Festival in Płock, 1971

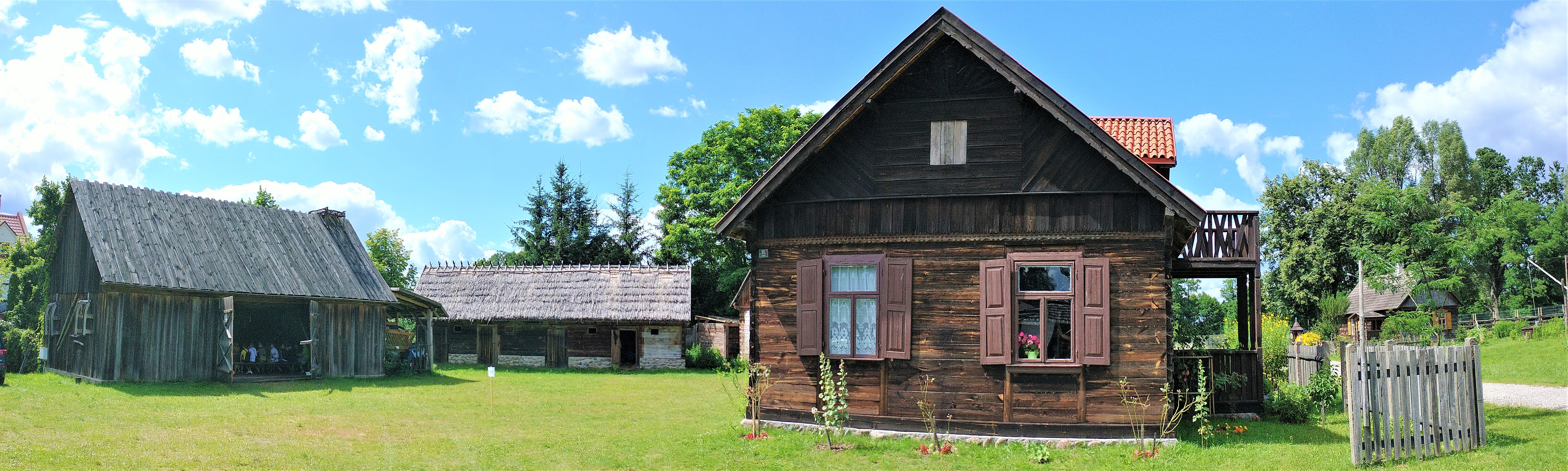
Fragment of the exhibition at the Maria Żywirska Open-Air Museum in Brańszczyk

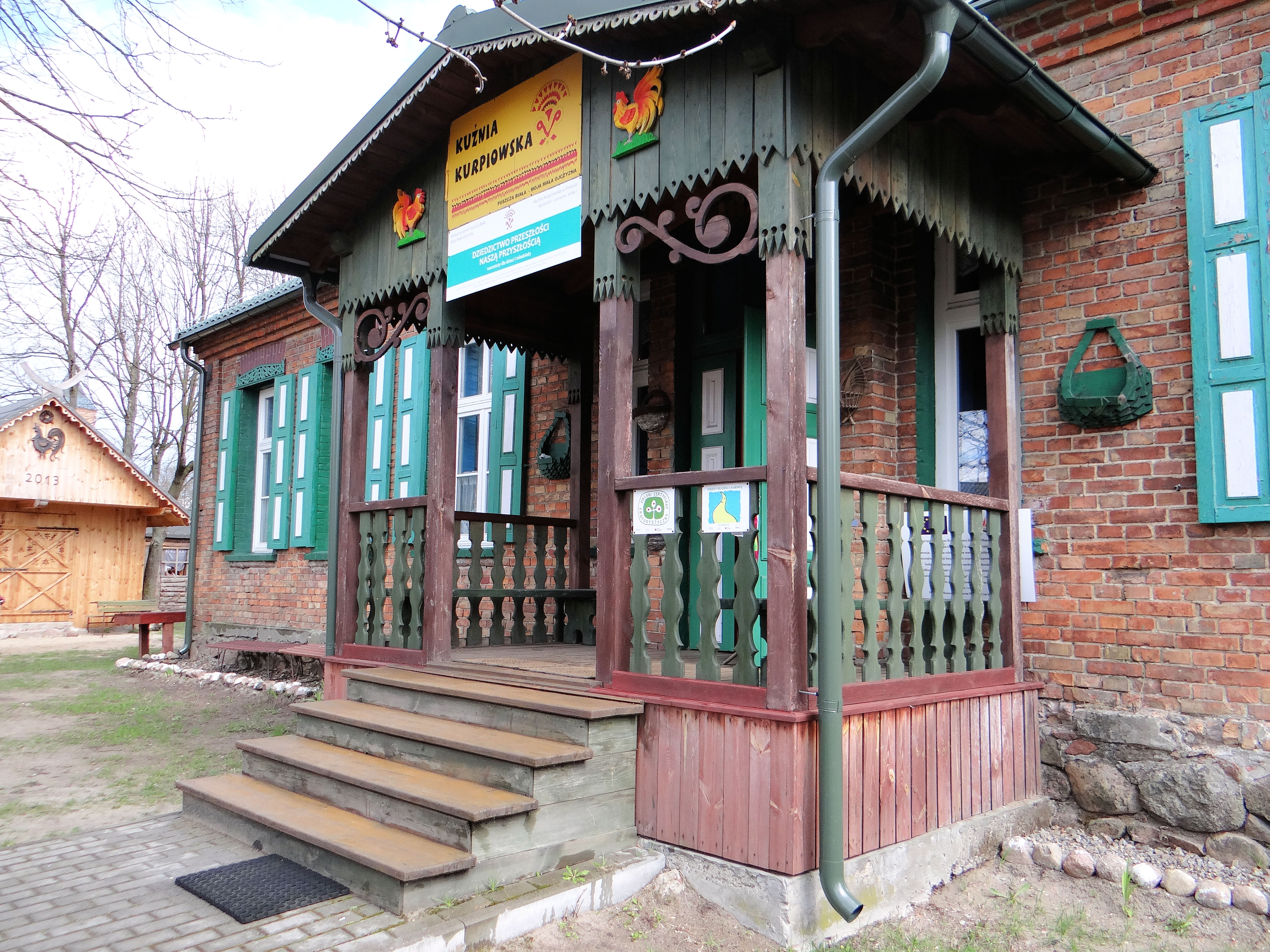
Kurpie Forge in Pniewo, run by the Puszcza Biała – My Little Homeland Association

After World War II, regional groups were active in maintaining and promoting the folklore of Kurpie Białe. The Regional Group Cepelia – Puszcza Biała was established in 1979 at the Cooperative of Folk and Artistic Handicraft Twórczość Kurpiowska in Pułtusk. The Regional Song and Dance Group Dzieci Puszczy Białej was formed in 1980, along with the Song and Dance Group Puszcza Biała from Obryte. The repertoire of the Golądkowo Song and Dance Group included pieces from Kurpie Białe. A significant contribution in this area was made by instructor and choreographer Bonifacy Kozłowski. The group Puszcza Biała also operated in Brok.

From 1983 to 1993, a Regional Chamber operated in the home of Stefania Seroka in Obryte. Some exhibits were brought from the Museum of Kurpie Culture in Ostrołęka, which oversaw the institution, while others included items from the furnishings of Seroka's home, as well as donations from residents of Obryte and surrounding villages, along with visitors. The Kurpie Association, established in 1996, is responsible for nurturing and preserving Kurpie culture, although it pays little attention to the culture of Puszcza Biała.

In 2004, the Ethnographic-Historical Museum was founded in Kamieńczyk through the private initiative of Henryk Słowikowski, collecting exhibits related to Puszcza Biała. Similar initiatives include a museum established by Alicja Paradowska in Długosiodło and the Ethnographic Museum of Andrzej Kongiel in Prostyń, which primarily present agricultural and household tools. Since 2014, the Maria Żywirska Open-Air Museum in Brańszczyk has gathered buildings and items connected with the history and culture of Kurpie Białe.

Museum centers such as the Regional Museum in Pułtusk and the Museum of Kurpie Culture in Ostrołęka play an important role. In the 21st century, the Municipal Cultural Center in Ostrów Mazowiecka also emerged. Local centers are important as well, with the most active being the Kurpie Blacksmith Shop in Pniewo. In the former school building, the association Puszcza Biała – My Little Homeland has organized a cultural center.

Promotion of Kurpie Białe folk art is also undertaken by libraries and cultural centers (e.g., the Joachim Lelewela Public Library in Pułtusk) and NGOs (like the Friends of Puszcza Biała and Kamieniecka Association, and the Wspólna Przyszłość Association from Leszczydół-Nowiny). Artistic workshops and demonstrations are organized in schools and cultural centers, often based on the annual ritual calendar. Meetings with artisans, competitions, and exhibitions are held. Memory rooms with artifacts of material culture are established in schools.

Research on Kurpie Białe is primarily found in popular scientific and tourism publications issued by local government offices or cultural promotion institutions. Notable works include Osadnictwo kurpiowskie na Puszczy Białej by Wincenty and Robert Szydlik, Folklor muzyczny i taneczny Puszczy Białej by Bonifacy Kozłowski, and Wędrówki po Puszczy Białej by Sylwia Słojkowska-Affelska, featuring photographs by Marian Pokropek.

There is a broad social movement within Puszcza Biała, animated by NGOs, schools, and museums, aimed at nurturing, restoring, and preserving the traditions of Kurpie Białe. This effort arises from a growing awareness of the region's cultural richness and a sense of identity among its residents and those from forest families.

Exhibits related to the material and spiritual culture of Kurpie Białe can be found in various collections, including the Regional Museum in Pułtusk, the Museum of Kurpie Culture in Ostrołęka, the Mazovian Museum in Płock, the Ethnographic Museum of Kraków, the Ethnographic Museum in Toruń, and the Polish Paper-Cutting Museum (under organization) linked to the Konstancin Cultural Center, as well as local educational institutions and memory rooms.

== In the 21st century ==
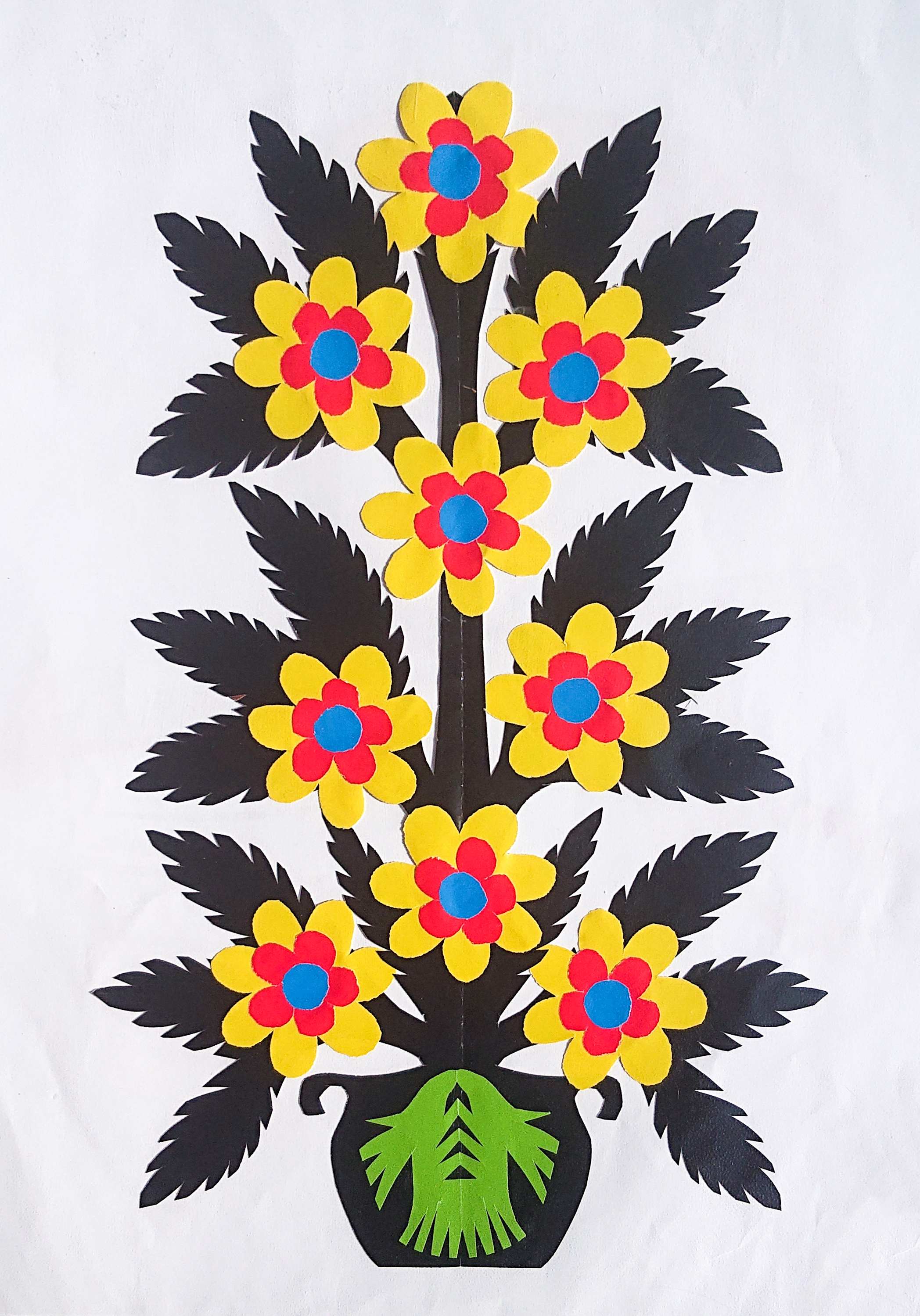
Paper cutout made by Emilia Fornalska, a member of the Puszcza Biała – My Little Homeland Association

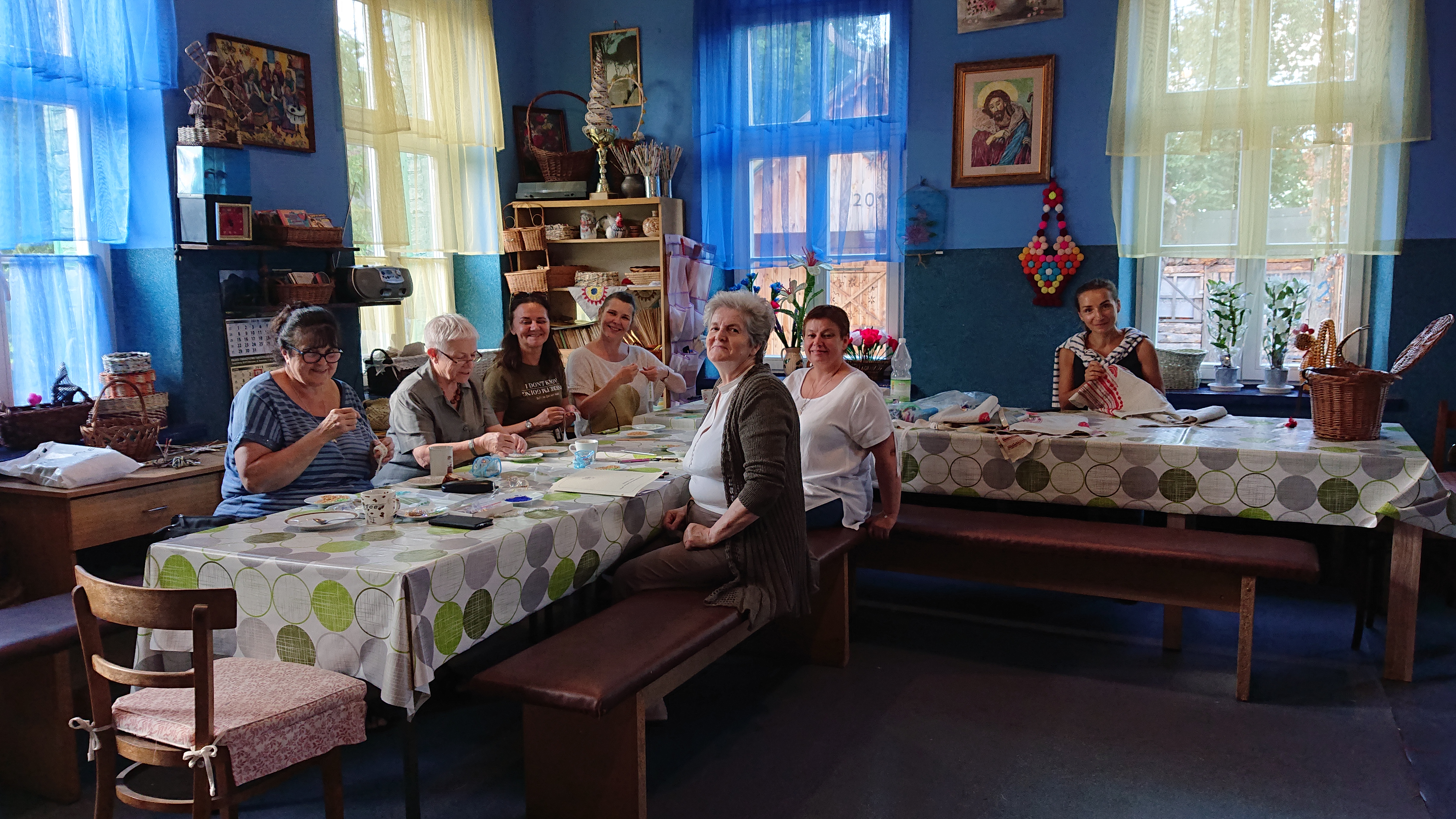
Workshops as part of the Zielko project, implemented by the Puszcza Biała – My Little Homeland Association in Pniewo, July 2019

The folk art of Kurpie Białe has diminished in prevalence and functionality compared to the past. The decline in creative expression within Puszcza Biała can be attributed to the fall of Cepelia, the realities of the market economy, and changing tastes among consumers. Nevertheless, through collaboration with local cultural centers, libraries, museums, galleries, and regional chambers, folk creators from Puszcza Biała can find a market for their work. In the 21st century, there is a noticeable effort among Kurpie Białe to rebuild their cultural identity. This is supported by state institutions, associations, and private individuals. Thanks to funding for rescue activities, creative scholarships, awards for achievements, and recognitions such as the Oskar Kolberg Award, it is possible to continue and appreciate the traditions of Kurpie Białe.

Notable recipients of the Oskar Kolberg Award include such creators from Puszcza Biała as Marianna Kowalska (1988), Helena Ochendowska (1993), Julianna Puławska (1994), Marianna Pogłód (1998), Krystyna Fabisiak (1999), and Halina Witkowska (2018). In 1996, the Kolberg Award was given to the Regional Team Cepelia – Puszcza Biała. Kurpie Białe have also been recognized in the region, with the President of the Kurpie Union Award Kurpik going to Julianna Puławska (2012 – Awakening Identity), Halina Witkowska (2013 – Awakening Identity), and Bonifacy Kozłowski (2014 – Music and Dance). Kurpie folk artists from Puszcza Biała are also described in regional biographical dictionaries.

In the 21st century, initiatives are emerging from local communities to preserve the memory and recreate the craft traditions of Kurpie Białe. The dissemination and promotion of folk art from Kurpie Białe are supported by institutions, organizations, and local governments. As a result, it becomes attractive to visitors to the region. At the central level, the material culture and folklore of Kurpie Białe are supported in various ways by the Ministry of Culture and National Heritage, the Masovian Voivodeship Marshal's Office, the Masovian Institute of Culture, the Cepelia Foundation, and the Leopold Kronenberg Bank Foundation.

Embroidery on tulle is practiced by: Stanisława Borek from Cieńszy, Czesława Pikora from Wielątki-Folwark, Marianna Abramczyk from Moszyn, and Janina Rogulska from Mystkówiec Stary. In the 21st century, embroiderers included or still include: Marianna Włodarczyk, Maria Murziak, Genowefa Łada, Teresa Włodarczyk, Stefania Woźnica, Maria Ćwik, Władysława Kamińska from Rząśnik, Jadwiga Kacprzyńska from Wielątki-Folwark, Halina Światkowska, Danuta Woźnica, Marianna Mięgoć from Pniewo, Julianna Puławska, and Maria Chmielewska from Pniewo-Kolonia, Marianna Marczak, Emilia Lewandowska, Halina Lewandowska, Teresa Jabłońska, and Urszula Krawczyk from Mystkówiec Stary, Władysława Ziółkowska and Anna Grzywacz from Wypych Nowe, Małgorzata Pikora and Zofia Budzińska from Wólka-Przekory, Marianna Chełchowska from Gródek Rządowy, Marianna Pogłód from Lutobrok, Genowefa Krakowiecka from Komorów, and Felicja Borek from Cieńszy.

One of the few active white Kurpie sculptors is Jerzy Zawadzki from Lubiel. He has been sculpting since 1998, mostly from lime and willow wood. He sells his works both domestically and internationally. He creates sculptures depicting Pensive Christ, chapels, figures of saints, as well as busts of famous people and characters from fairy tales. His works can be seen at fairs, harvest festivals, and exhibitions organized by cultural centers in the region.

Basket weaving and plaiting have declined. Apolinary Podleś from Tuchlin is one of the last basket weavers. He learned from his father and grandfather. He sold his products at markets and fairs in Wyszków and Ostrów Mazowiecka, and sometimes further afield. He creates Easter baskets, shopping baskets, and large utility baskets. He also makes furniture for individual orders. Another basket weaver from Puszcza Biała is Arkadiusz Najmuła from Tuchlin, a graduate of the Secondary School of Basketry in Skwierzyna who collaborated with Cepelia. He presents and sells his works in Ciechanowiec, Pułtusk, Wyszków, and Ostrów Mazowiecka.

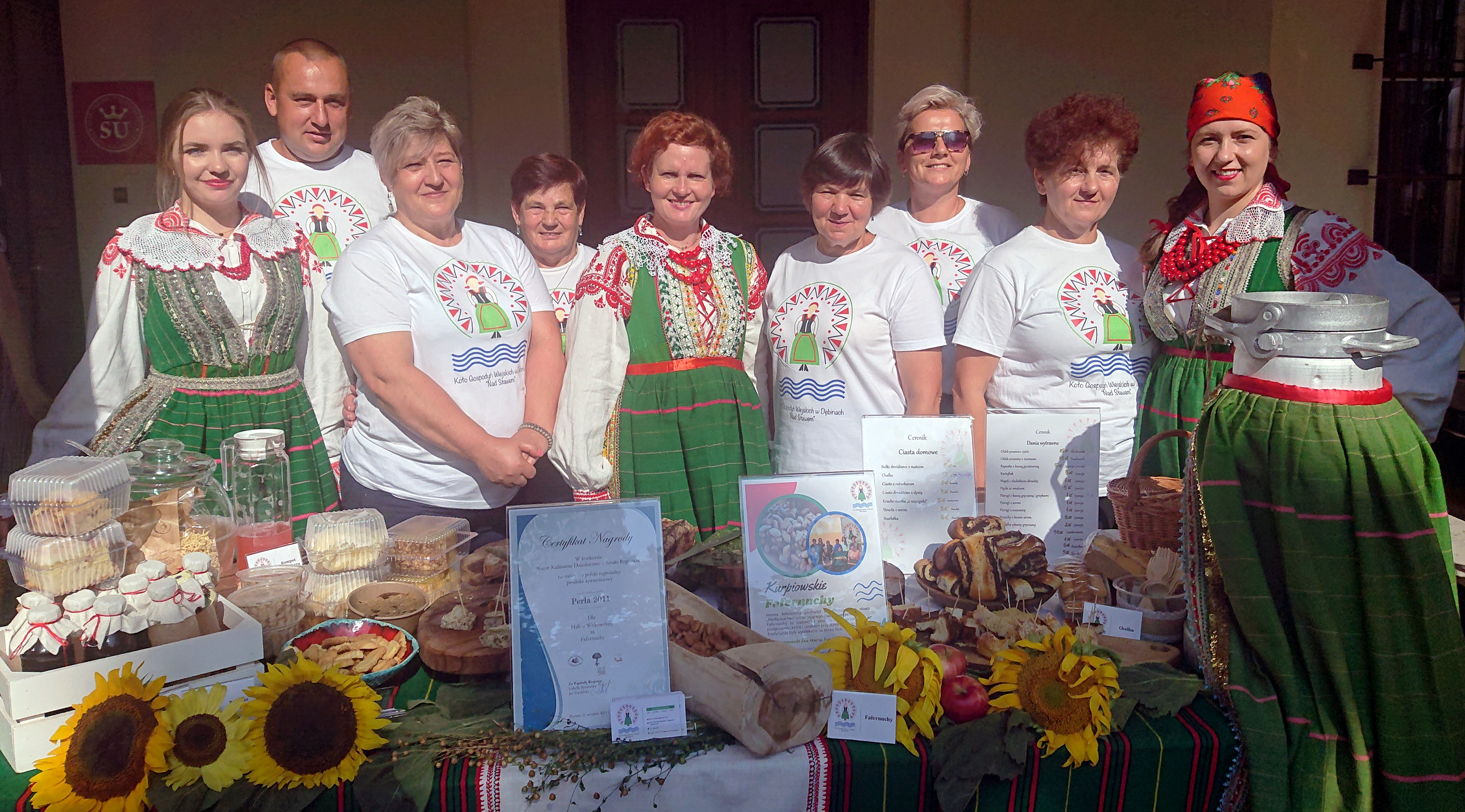
The representation of the KGW Nad Stawem in Dębiny at the fair on the occasion of the Kurpie edition of the Summer Stage organized by the National Institute of Culture and Heritage of the Countryside, August 13, 2022

In the 21st century, Kurpie paper cutting from Puszcza Biała is practiced by Emilia Fornalska from Bartodzieje and women from Rząśnik: Władysława Kamińska, Teresa Włodarczyk, Stefania Woźnica, and Genowefa Łada. Dried flower compositions are created by Janina Kopaniarz from Znamiączki, her daughter Barbara, and granddaughter Beata Machnowska.

Regional groups are actively operating, including the Song and Dance Group BezWianka at the Municipal Cultural Center in Ostrów Mazowiecka, the Song and Dance Group Nad Narwią from the Bolesław Prus School in Pułtusk, the Song and Dance Group Oberek at the Wyszków Cultural Center Hutnik, the Golądkowo Group, the Puszcza Biała Group from Rząśnik, the Grajewianie Song and Dance Group, the Folk Group Jarzębina from Brok, the Folk Dance Group Ostrołęka, the Kurpie Zielone Song and Dance Group at the Podlaskie Institute of Culture in Białystok, and the Gloria Group from the parish of Obryte. The dances and songs of Kurpie Białe are included in the repertoire of several prestigious groups, such as the State Folk Song and Dance Group Mazowsze, the Śląsk Song and Dance Ensemble, the Warsaw University of Technology Song and Dance Group, the Harnam Folk Dance Ensemble, and the Jagiellonian University Song and Dance Group Słowianki.

Support for the material culture of Kurpie Białe includes workshops conducted at the Kurpie Blacksmith Shop in Pniewo and exhibitions such as Haft Puszczy Białej at the Regional Museum in Pułtusk (2021) and Hafciarka ręczna at the Kurpie Culture Museum in Ostrołęka (2022). Various initiatives promote Kurpie culture, such as showcasing regional costumes in promotional materials for the Biedronka chain (September 2022) and displaying cultural products in popular tourist locations, like the Summer Scene of the National Institute of Culture and Heritage of the Countryside dedicated to Puszcza Biała and Puszcza Zielona on 13 August 2022 at 66 Krakowskie Przedmieście Street in Warsaw.

A testament to the care for regional heritage and the revival of handicraft traditions is the inclusion of Kurpie embroidery from Puszcza Biała on the National List of Intangible Cultural Heritage (2022). The depositaries of this entry are embroiderers from the Puszcza Biała – My Little Homeland Association.

== Bibliography ==
- Biernacka, Paulina (2019). "Wycinanki kurpiowskie dawniej i współcześnie w analizie źródeł ikonograficznych oraz w relacjach rozmówców z obszarów Kurpiowszczyzny" [Kurpie Paper Cutouts: Past and Present in the Analysis of Iconographic Sources and in the Accounts of Interviewees from the Kurpie Region]. In Wardzyński, Michał; Pieńkos, Andrzej (eds.). Sztuka na Mazowszu. Nowe otwarcie [Art in Mazovia: A New Opening] (in Polish). Mazowiecki Instytut Kultury. ISBN 978-83-63427-27-6.
- Brzezińska, Anna Weronika; Słojkowska-Affelska, Sylwia (2007). "Współczesna twórczość ludowa Puszczy Białej" [Contemporary Folk Art of the Biała Forest]. In Szczepański, Janusz (ed.). Pułtusk. Studia i materiały z dziejów miasta i regionu [Pułtusk: Studies and Materials on the History of the Town and Region] (in Polish). Vol. 7. Mazowiecki Instytut Kultury. ISBN 978-83-63427-27-6.
- Dobroński, Adam (2021). "Czy istnieli Kurpie-Gocie?" [Did Kurpie-Gocie Exist?]. Zeszyty Naukowe Ostrołęckiego Towarzystwa Naukowego (in Polish). 35. ISSN 0860-9608.
- Dymek, Benon (2010). "Przywilej lokacyjny biskupa płockiego Antoniego Sebastiana Dembowskiego w sprawie osadnictwa wsi w Puszczy Białej z 1748 r." [The Settlement Privilege of Bishop Antoni Sebastian Dembowski of Płock Regarding the Colonization of Villages in Puszcza Białą from 1748]. Rocznik Mazowiecki (in Polish). 22. ISSN 0080-3529.
- Kutrzeba-Pojnarowa, Anna (1989). "Puszcza Biała jako region etnograficzny (stan i potrzeby badań)" [Puszcza Biała as an Ethnographic Region: State and Research Needs]. In Kazimierski, Jan (ed.). Brok i Puszcza Biała [Brok and Puszcza Biała] (in Polish).
- Słojkowska-Affelska, Sylwia (2014). Wędrówki po Puszczy Białej [Journeys through Puszcza Biała] (in Polish). Muzeum Regionalne. ISBN 978-83-901917-9-9.
- Samsel, Maria; Dul, Robert Andrzej (2020). Wycinanka kurpiowska z Puszczy Zielonej. Katalog wystawy [The Kurpie paper-cutting from the Green Forest. Exhibition catalogue] (in Polish). Ostrołęka: Muzeum Kultury Kurpiowskiej w Ostrołęce. ISBN 978-83-953620-5-7.
- Szydlik, Wincenty (1999). "Kurpie na Puszczy Białej" [Kurpie in Puszcza Biała]. Zeszyty Naukowe Ostrołęckiego Towarzystwa Naukowego (in Polish). 13. ISSN 0860-9608.
- Żywirska, Maria (1973). Puszcza Biała. Jej dzieje i kultura [Puszcza Biała: Its History and Culture] (in Polish).
