= Lemany, Masovian Voivodeship =

Lemany
- Village
- Location within Poland
- Coordinates: 52°38′52″N 21°13′37″E
- Country: Poland
- Voivodeship: Masovian
- County: Pułtusk
- Gmina: Zatory

Population (2021)
  - Total: 88
- Time zone: UTC+1 (CET)
  - Summer (DST): UTC+2 (CEST)

Lemany [lɛˈmanɨ] is a village in the administrative district of Gmina Zatory, within Pułtusk County, Masovian Voivodeship, in east-central Poland.

Five Polish citizens were murdered by Nazi Germany in the village during World War II.
