= Fiszor =

Coordinates: 52°31′45″N 21°19′50″E

Location
- Country: Poland

Physical characteristics
- Mouth
  - location: Młynarze

The Fiszor is a river of Wyszków County in the Masovian Voivodeship of eastern central Poland, a left tributary of the Bug River. It is 27.16 kilometres (16.88 mi) long and flows through Choszczowe, Mostówka, in the vicinity of Niegów and the village of Młynarze in Gmina Wyszków district. It flows into the Bug near the village of Słopsk, which is roughly 25 kilometres (16 mi) northeast by air from the northern outskirts of Warsaw.
