= Stasin =

Stasin may refer to the following places:

- Stasin, Kuyavian-Pomeranian Voivodeship (north-central Poland)
- Stasin, Gmina Konopnica in Lublin Voivodeship (east Poland)
- Stasin, Gmina Wojciechów in Lublin Voivodeship (east Poland)
- Stasin, Gmina Chodel in Lublin Voivodeship (east Poland)
- Stasin, Gmina Józefów nad Wisłą in Lublin Voivodeship (east Poland)
- Stasin, Siedlce County in Masovian Voivodeship (east-central Poland)
- Stasin, Sokołów County in Masovian Voivodeship (east-central Poland)
- Stasin, Wyszków County in Masovian Voivodeship (east-central Poland)
- Stasin, Greater Poland Voivodeship (west-central Poland)
