= Stare Wypychy =

- Village
- Location within Poland
- Coordinates: 52°37′09″N 21°17′28″E
- Country: Poland
- Voivodeship: Masovian
- County: Wyszków
- Gmina: Somianka

Stare Wypychy [ˈstarɛ vɨˈpɨxɨ] is a village in the administrative district of Gmina Somianka, within Wyszków County, Masovian Voivodeship, in east-central Poland.
