= Poręba-Kocęby =

- Village
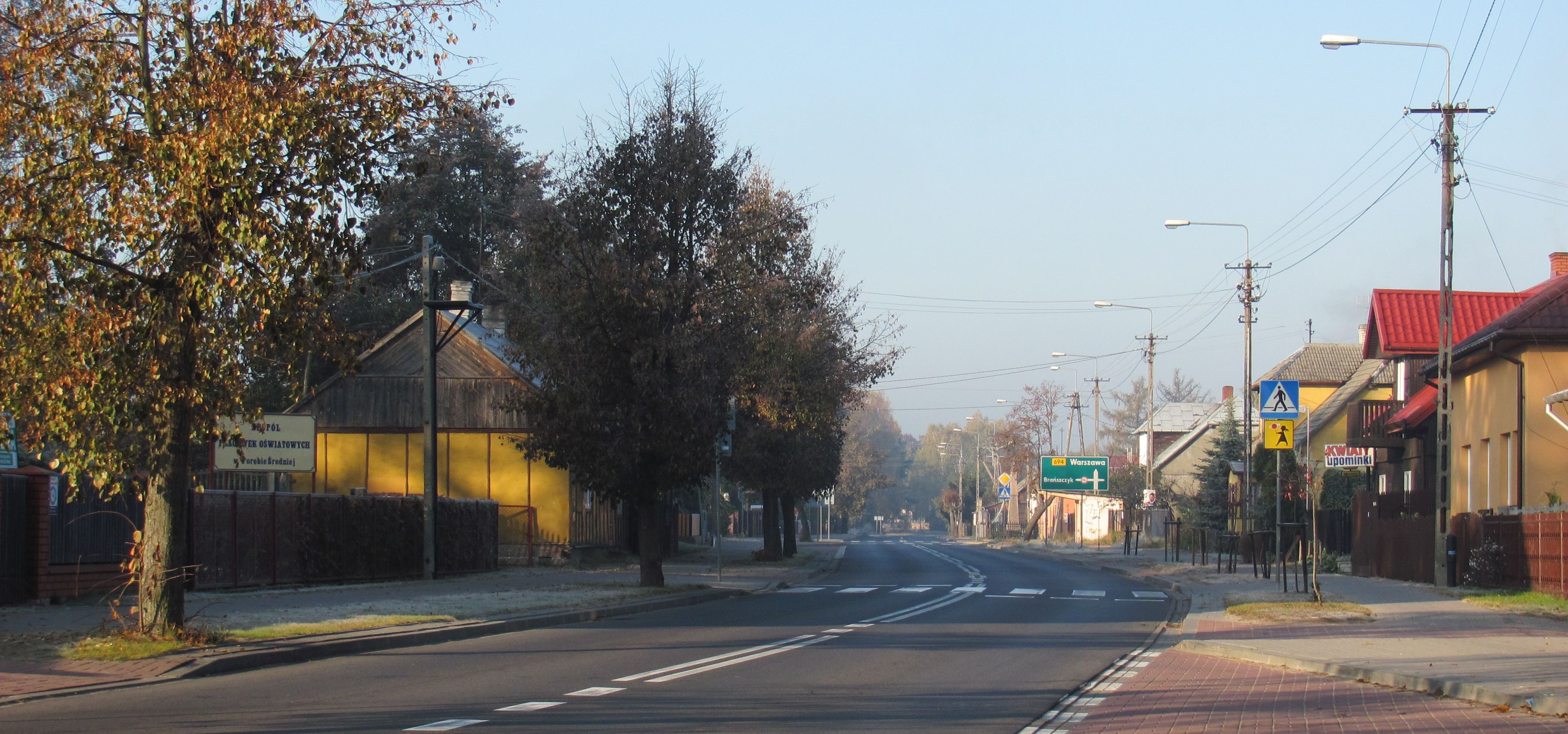

- Location within Poland
- Coordinates: 52°42′N 21°41′E
- Country: Poland
- Voivodeship: Masovian
- County: Wyszków
- Gmina: Brańszczyk
- Population: 440

Poręba-Kocęby [pɔˈrɛmba kɔˈt͡sɛmbɨ] is a village in the administrative district of Gmina Brańszczyk, within Wyszków County, Masovian Voivodeship, in east-central Poland.
