= Nowy Brańszczyk =

- Village
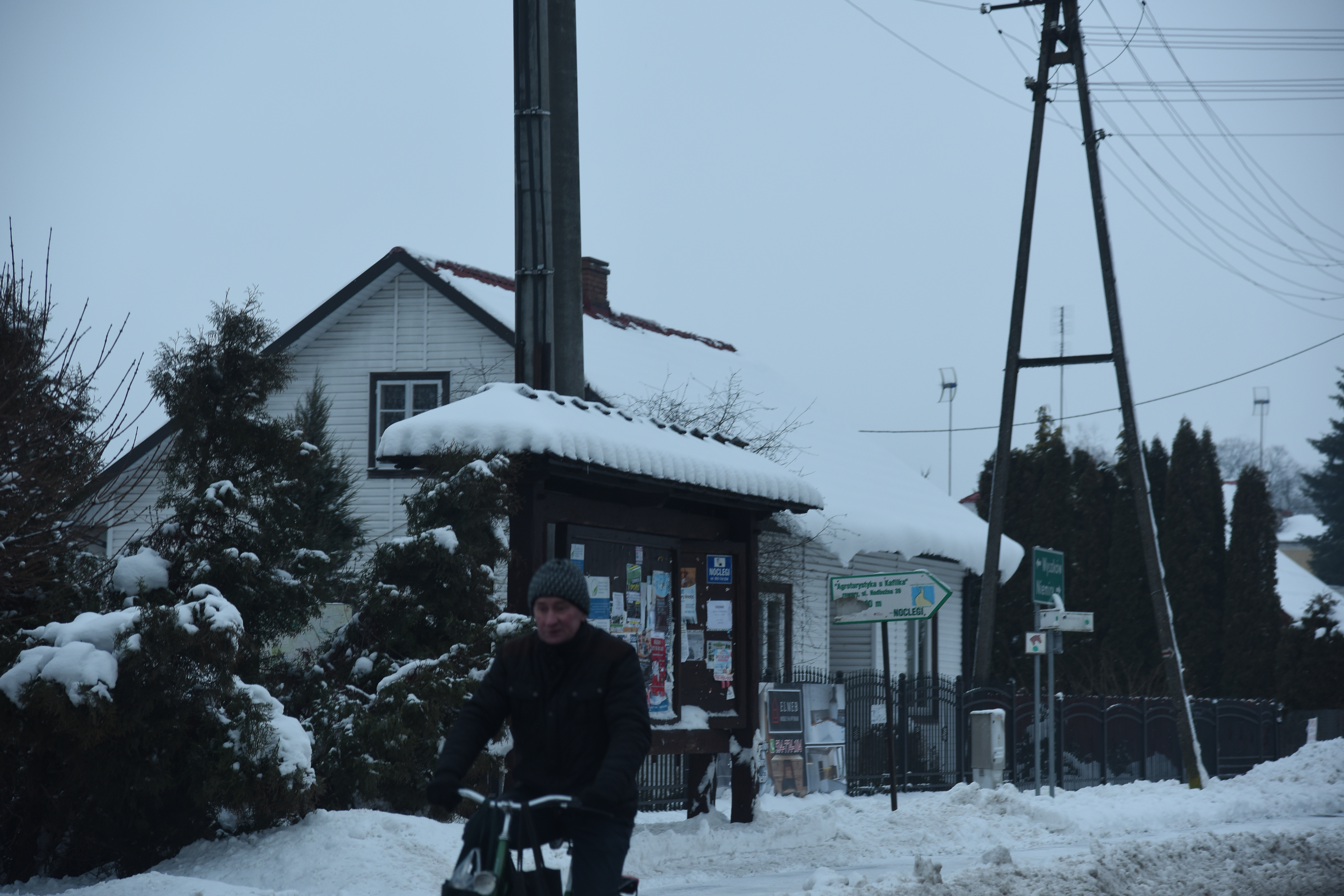

- Location within Poland
- Coordinates: 52°38′N 21°35′E
- Country: Poland
- Voivodeship: Masovian
- County: Wyszków
- Gmina: Brańszczyk
- Population: 330

Nowy Brańszczyk [ˈnɔvɨ ˈbraɲʂt͡ʂɨk] is a village in the administrative district of Gmina Brańszczyk, within Wyszków County, Masovian Voivodeship, in east-central Poland.
