= Rogóźno, Masovian Voivodeship =

Rogóźno
- Village
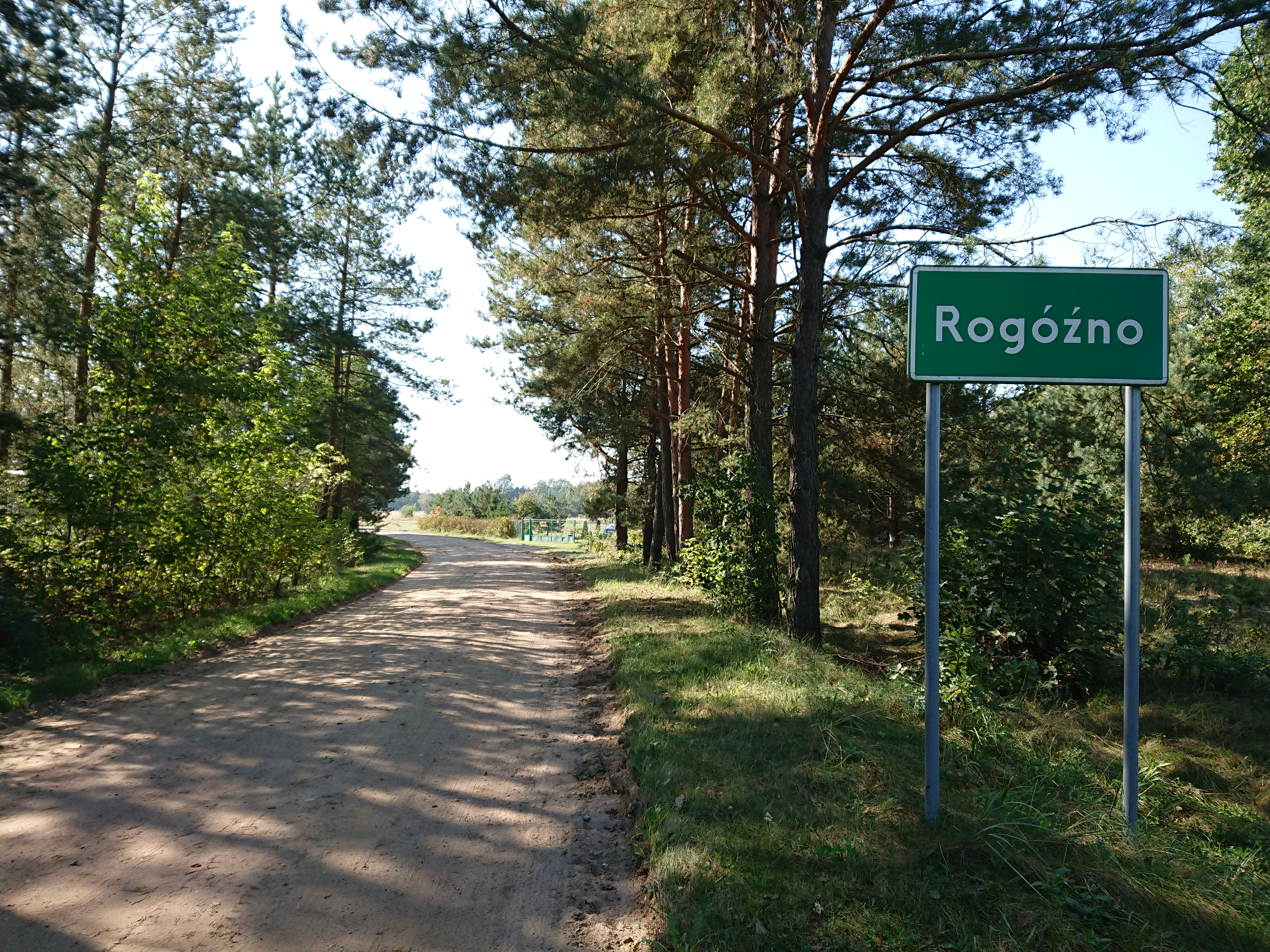
- Rogóźno road sign

- Location within Poland
- Coordinates: 52°46′55″N 21°21′31″E
- Country: Poland
- Voivodeship: Masovian
- County: Wyszków
- Gmina: Rząśnik

Rogóźno [rɔˈɡuʑnɔ] is a village in the administrative district of Gmina Rząśnik, within Wyszków County, Masovian Voivodeship, in east-central Poland.
