= Adamowo, Wyszków County =

Adamowo
- Village
- Location within Poland
- Coordinates: 52°44′11″N 21°29′24″E
- Country: Poland
- Voivodeship: Masovian
- County: Wyszków
- Gmina: Długosiodło

Adamowo [adaˈmɔvɔ] is a village in the administrative district of Gmina Długosiodło, within Wyszków County, Masovian Voivodeship, in east-central Poland.
