= Osiny, Wyszków County =

Village in Gmina Rząśnik, Poland

Osiny
- Village
- Location within Poland
- Coordinates: 52°45′33″N 21°22′03″E
- Country: Poland
- Voivodeship: Masovian
- County: Wyszków
- Gmina: Rząśnik

Osiny [ɔˈɕinɨ] is a village in the administrative district of Gmina Rząśnik, within Wyszków County, Masovian Voivodeship, in east-central Poland.
