= Lipniak-Majorat =

- Village
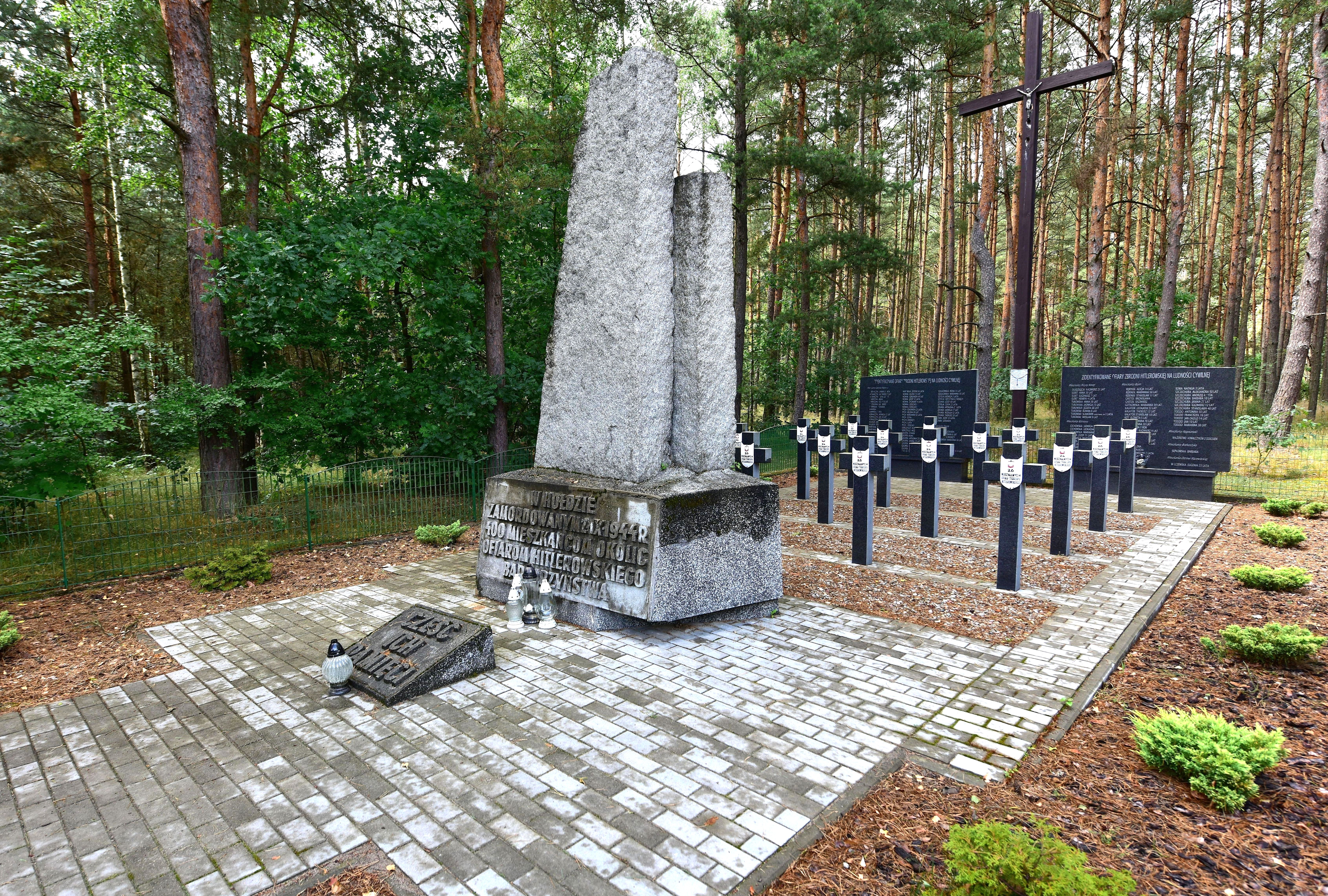
- Memorial to Poles murdered by the Germans in Lipniak-Majorat in 1944

- Location within Poland
- Coordinates: 52°45′51″N 21°39′18″E
- Country: Poland
- Voivodeship: Masovian
- County: Wyszków
- Gmina: Długosiodło
- Time zone: UTC+1 (CET)
  - Summer (DST): UTC+2 (CEST)
- Vehicle registration: WWY

Lipniak-Majorat [ˈlipɲak maˈjɔrat] is a village in the administrative district of Gmina Długosiodło, within Wyszków County, Masovian Voivodeship, in east-central Poland.

== History ==
During the German occupation of Poland (World War II), on September 2, 1944, German troops carried out a massacre of around 450 Poles, including many women and children, in the village. It was one of several pacifications perpetrated in the area in retaliation for German losses suffered in the battles of Jarząbka and Pecynka, which were fought nearby against the Polish Home Army.
