= Stare Płudy =

- Village
- Location within Poland
- Coordinates: 52°34′14″N 21°15′59″E
- Country: Poland
- Voivodeship: Masovian
- County: Wyszków
- Gmina: Somianka

Stare Płudy [ˈstarɛ ˈpwudɨ] is a village in the administrative district of Gmina Somianka, within Wyszków County, Masovian Voivodeship, in east-central Poland.
