= Komorowo, Wyszków County =

Komorowo
- Village
- Location within Poland
- Coordinates: 52°40′N 21°20′E
- Country: Poland
- Voivodeship: Masovian
- County: Wyszków
- Gmina: Rząśnik

Komorowo [kɔmɔˈrɔvɔ] is a village in the administrative district of Gmina Rząśnik, in Wyszków County, Masovian Voivodeship, in east-central Poland.
