= Tuchlin, Masovian Voivodeship =

Tuchlin
- Village
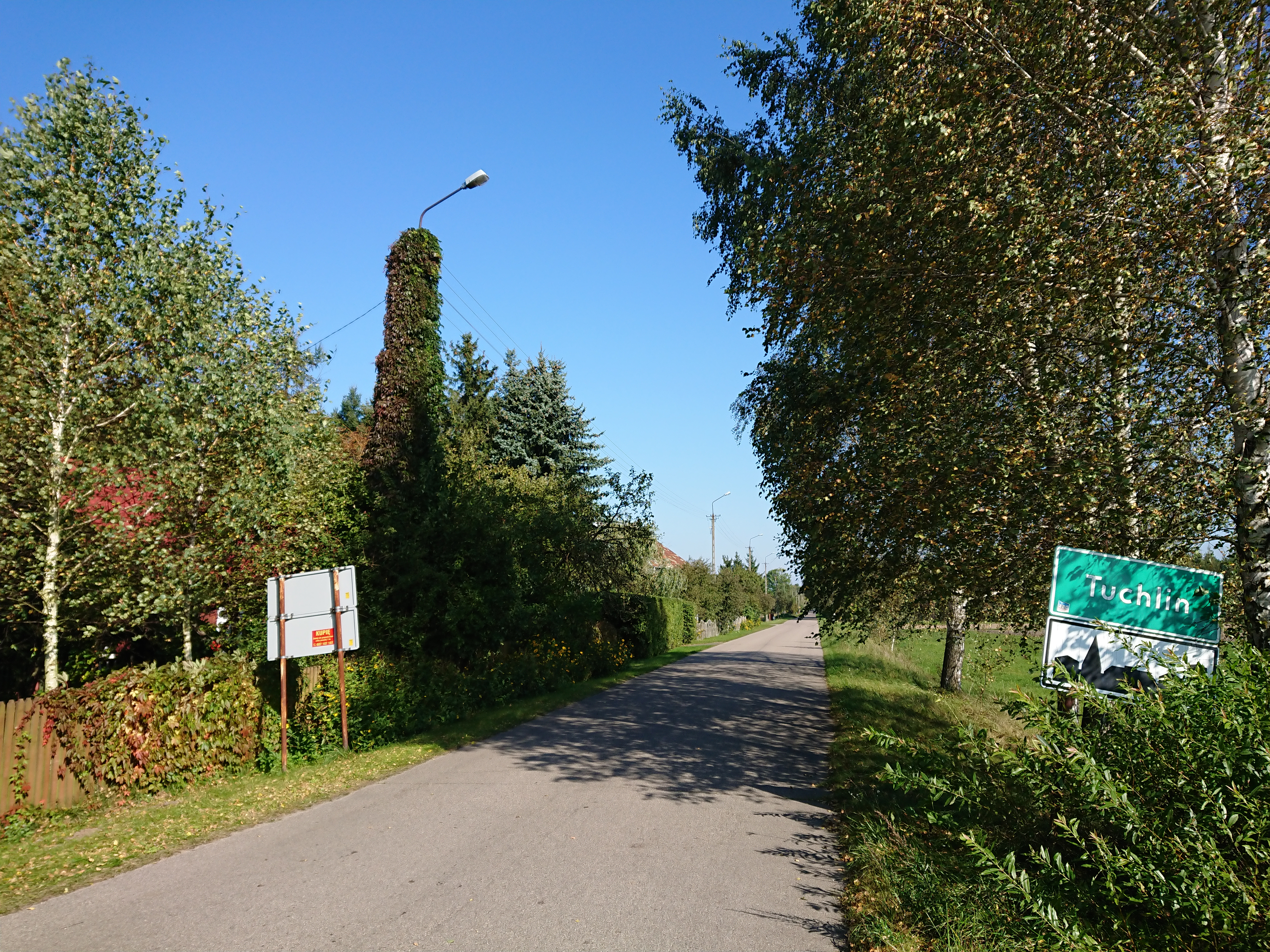

- Location within Poland
- Coordinates: 52°38′22″N 21°41′21″E
- Country: Poland
- Voivodeship: Masovian
- County: Wyszków
- Gmina: Brańszczyk

Population
  - Total: 260
- Time zone: UTC+1 (CET)
  - Summer (DST): UTC+2 (CEST)

Tuchlin [ˈtuxlin] is a village in the administrative district of Gmina Brańszczyk, within Wyszków County, Masovian Voivodeship, in east-central Poland.

Five Polish citizens were murdered by Nazi Germany in the village during World War II.
