= Kalinowo, Wyszków County =

Kalinowo
- Village
- Location within Poland
- Coordinates: 52°43′16″N 21°34′55″E
- Country: Poland
- Voivodeship: Masovian
- County: Wyszków
- Gmina: Długosiodło

Kalinowo [kaliˈnɔvɔ] is a village in the administrative district of Gmina Długosiodło, within Wyszków County, Masovian Voivodeship, in east-central Poland.
