= Stare Kozłowo =

- Village
- Location within Poland
- Coordinates: 52°36′N 21°19′E
- Country: Poland
- Voivodeship: Masovian
- County: Wyszków
- Gmina: Somianka
- Population (approx.): 400

Stare Kozłowo [ˈstarɛ kɔˈzwɔvɔ] is a village in the administrative district of Gmina Somianka, within Wyszków County, Masovian Voivodeship, in east-central Poland.
