= Marianowo, Wyszków County =

Marianowo
- Village
- Location within Poland
- Coordinates: 52°45′18″N 21°29′04″E
- Country: Poland
- Voivodeship: Masovian
- County: Wyszków
- Gmina: Długosiodło

Marianowo [marjaˈnɔvɔ] is a village in the administrative district of Gmina Długosiodło, within Wyszków County, Masovian Voivodeship, in east-central Poland.
