= Zdziebórz =

- Village
- Location within Poland
- Coordinates: 52°35′38″N 21°17′06″E
- Country: Poland
- Voivodeship: Masovian
- County: Wyszków
- Gmina: Somianka

Zdziebórz [ˈzd͡ʑɛbuʂ] is a village in the administrative district of Gmina Somianka, within Wyszków County, Masovian Voivodeship, in east-central Poland.
