= Wielątki Rosochate =

- Village
- Location within Poland
- Coordinates: 52°38′N 21°19′E
- Country: Poland
- Voivodeship: Masovian
- County: Wyszków
- Gmina: Somianka

Wielątki Rosochate [vjɛˈlɔntki rɔsɔˈxatɛ] is a Polish village in the Gmina Somianka administrative district. The district is found within Wyszków County, and the county is part of the Masovian Voivodeship found in east-central Poland.
