= Wólka Piaseczna, Masovian Voivodeship =

Wólka Piaseczna
- Village
- Location within Poland
- Coordinates: 52°47′43″N 21°34′53″E
- Country: Poland
- Voivodeship: Masovian
- County: Wyszków
- Gmina: Długosiodło

Wólka Piaseczna [ˈvulka pjaˈsɛt͡ʂna] is a village in the administrative district of Gmina Długosiodło, within Wyszków County, Masovian Voivodeship, in east-central Poland.
