= Knurowiec =

- Village
- Location within Poland
- Coordinates: 52°40′N 21°37′E
- Country: Poland
- Voivodeship: Masovian
- County: Wyszków
- Gmina: Brańszczyk

Knurowiec [knuˈrɔvjɛt͡s] is a village in the administrative district of Gmina Brańszczyk, within Wyszków County, Masovian Voivodeship, in east-central Poland.
