= Ojcowizna =

- Village
- Location within Poland
- Coordinates: 52°38′16″N 21°32′14″E
- Country: Poland
- Voivodeship: Masovian
- County: Wyszków
- Gmina: Brańszczyk

Ojcowizna [ɔi̯t͡sɔˈvizna] is a village in the administrative district of Gmina Brańszczyk, within Wyszków County, Masovian Voivodeship, in east-central Poland.
