= Stare Suski =

- Village
- Location within Poland
- Coordinates: 52°49′30″N 21°37′29″E
- Country: Poland
- Voivodeship: Masovian
- County: Wyszków
- Gmina: Długosiodło

Stare Suski (Polish pronunciation: [ˈstarɛ ˈsuskʲi]) is a village in the administrative district of Gmina Długosiodło, within Wyszków County, Masovian Voivodeship, in east-central Poland.
