= Henrysin, Wyszków County =

Henrysin
- Village
- Location within Poland
- Coordinates: 52°33′29″N 21°12′26″E
- Country: Poland
- Voivodeship: Masovian
- County: Wyszków
- Gmina: Somianka

Henrysin [xɛnˈrɨɕin] is a village in the administrative district of Gmina Somianka, within Wyszków County, Masovian Voivodeship, in east-central Poland.
