= Mościska, Wyszków County =

Mościska
- Village
- Location within Poland
- Coordinates: 52°29′03″N 21°28′19″E
- Country: Poland
- Voivodeship: Masovian
- County: Wyszków
- Gmina: Zabrodzie

Mościska [mɔɕˈt͡ɕiska] is a village in the administrative district of Gmina Zabrodzie, within Wyszków County, Masovian Voivodeship, in east-central Poland.
