= Barcice =

Barcice may refer to the following villages in Poland:

- Barcice, Lesser Poland Voivodeship in Lesser Poland Voivodeship (south Poland)
- Barcice, Masovian Voivodeship in Masovian Voivodeship (central Poland)
- Barcice, Pomeranian Voivodeship in Pomeranian Voivodeship (north Poland)
