= Janki, Wyszków County =

Janki
- Village
- Location within Poland
- Coordinates: 52°32′12″N 21°13′15″E
- Country: Poland
- Voivodeship: Masovian
- County: Wyszków
- Gmina: Somianka
- Population (approx.): 100

Janki [ˈjanki] is a village in the administrative district of Gmina Somianka, within Wyszków County, Masovian Voivodeship, in east-central Poland.
