= Stary Mystkówiec =

- Village
- Location within Poland
- Coordinates: 52°37′51″N 21°16′33″E
- Country: Poland
- Voivodeship: Masovian
- County: Wyszków
- Gmina: Somianka

Stary Mystkówiec [ˈstarɨ mɨstˈkuvjɛt͡s] is a village in the administrative district of Gmina Somianka, within Wyszków County, Masovian Voivodeship, in east-central Poland.
