= Stara Pecyna =

- Village
- Location within Poland
- Coordinates: 52°46′38″N 21°38′50″E
- Country: Poland
- Voivodeship: Masovian
- County: Wyszków
- Gmina: Długosiodło
- Population: 144

Stara Pecyna [ˈstara pɛˈt͡sɨna] is a village in the administrative district of Gmina Długosiodło, within Wyszków County, Masovian Voivodeship, in east-central Poland.
