= Nowa Wieś, Gmina Rząśnik =

Nowa Wieś
- Village
- Location within Poland
- Coordinates: 52°45′05″N 21°25′25″E
- Country: Poland
- Voivodeship: Masovian
- County: Wyszków
- Gmina: Rząśnik

Nowa Wieś [ˈnɔva ˈvjɛɕ] is a village in the administrative district of Gmina Rząśnik, within Wyszków County, Masovian Voivodeship, in east-central Poland.
