= Nowe Wypychy =

- Village
- Location within Poland
- Coordinates: 52°37′44″N 21°17′21″E
- Country: Poland
- Voivodeship: Masovian
- County: Wyszków
- Gmina: Somianka

Nowe Wypychy [ˈnɔvɛ vɨˈpɨxɨ] is a village in the administrative district of Gmina Somianka, within Wyszków County, Masovian Voivodeship, in east-central Poland.
