= Zygmuntowo, Wyszków County =

Zygmuntowo
- Village
- Location within Poland
- Coordinates: 52°43′55″N 21°30′29″E
- Country: Poland
- Voivodeship: Masovian
- County: Wyszków
- Gmina: Długosiodło

Zygmuntowo [zɨɡmunˈtɔvɔ] is a village in the administrative district of Gmina Długosiodło, within Wyszków County, Masovian Voivodeship, in east-central Poland.
