= Grądy Polewne =

- Village
- Location within Poland
- Coordinates: 52°44′N 21°26′E
- Country: Poland
- Voivodeship: Masovian
- County: Wyszków
- Gmina: Rząśnik

Grądy Polewne [ˈɡrɔndɨ pɔˈlɛvnɛ] is a village in the administrative district of Gmina Rząśnik, within Wyszków County, Masovian Voivodeship, in east-central Poland.
