= Grądy Zalewne =

- Village
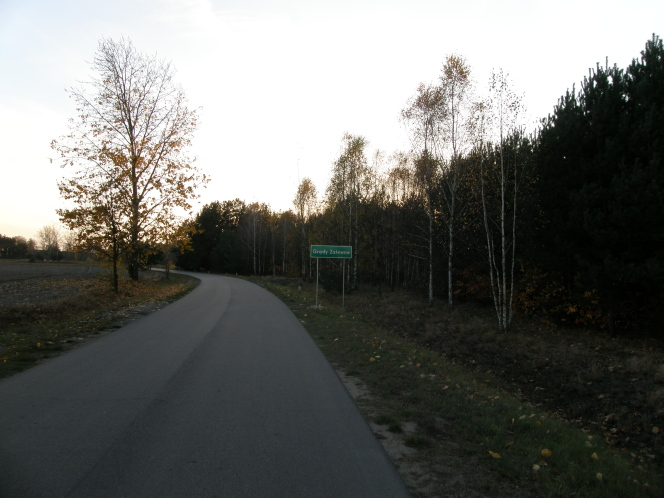
- Entrance to Grądy Zalewne village, Długosiodło, Poland

- Location within Poland
- Coordinates: 52°46′00″N 21°27′00″E
- Country: Poland
- Voivodeship: Masovian
- County: Wyszków
- Gmina: Długosiodło

Grądy Zalewne [ˈɡrɔndɨ zaˈlɛvnɛ] is a village in the administrative district of Gmina Długosiodło, within Wyszków County, Masovian Voivodeship, in east-central Poland.
