= Józefowo, Wyszków County =

Józefowo
- Village
- Location within Poland
- Coordinates: 52°45′0″N 21°21′33″E
- Country: Poland
- Voivodeship: Masovian
- County: Wyszków
- Gmina: Rząśnik

Józefowo (Polish pronunciation: [juzɛˈfɔvɔ]) is a village in the administrative district of Gmina Rząśnik, within Wyszków County, Masovian Voivodeship, in east-central Poland.
