= Łączka, Wyszków County =

Łączka
- Village
- Location within Poland
- Coordinates: 52°44′39″N 21°37′17″E
- Country: Poland
- Voivodeship: Masovian
- County: Wyszków
- Gmina: Długosiodło

Łączka [ˈwɔnt͡ʂka] is a village in the administrative district of Gmina Długosiodło, within Wyszków County, Masovian Voivodeship, in east-central Poland.
