= Nowa Wieś, Gmina Długosiodło =

Nowa Wieś
- Village
- Location within Poland
- Coordinates: 52°46′21″N 21°28′6″E
- Country: Poland
- Voivodeship: Masovian
- County: Wyszków
- Gmina: Długosiodło
- Population: 103

Nowa Wieś [ˈnɔva ˈvjɛɕ] is a village in the administrative district of Gmina Długosiodło, within Wyszków County, Masovian Voivodeship, in east-central Poland.
