= Ostrykół Włościański =

- Village
- Location within Poland
- Coordinates: 52°47′N 21°29′E
- Country: Poland
- Voivodeship: Masovian
- County: Wyszków
- Gmina: Długosiodło
- Population: 89

Ostrykół Włościański (Polish pronunciation: [ɔsˈtrɨkuw vwɔɕˈtɕaj̃skʲi]) is a village in the administrative district of Gmina Długosiodło, within Wyszków County, Masovian Voivodeship, in east-central Poland.
