= Niemiry, Wyszków County =

Niemiry
- Village
- Location within Poland
- Coordinates: 52°38′58″N 21°35′38″E
- Country: Poland
- Voivodeship: Masovian
- County: Wyszków
- Gmina: Brańszczyk

Niemiry [ɲɛˈmirɨ] is a village in the administrative district of Gmina Brańszczyk, within Wyszków County, Masovian Voivodeship, in east-central Poland.
