= Wielęcin =

- Village
- Location within Poland
- Coordinates: 52°34′N 21°11′E
- Country: Poland
- Voivodeship: Masovian
- County: Wyszków
- Gmina: Somianka

Wielęcin [vjɛˈlɛnt͡ɕin] is a village in the administrative district of Gmina Somianka, within Wyszków County, Masovian Voivodeship, in east-central Poland.
