= Dalekie-Tartak =

- Village
- Location within Poland
- Coordinates: 52°40′48″N 21°29′31″E
- Country: Poland
- Voivodeship: Masovian
- County: Wyszków
- Gmina: Brańszczyk
- Population: 314

Dalekie-Tartak [daˈlɛkʲɛ ˈtartak] is a village in the administrative district of Gmina Brańszczyk, within Wyszków County, Masovian Voivodeship, in east-central Poland.
