= Karolinów, Wyszków County =

Karolinów
- Village
- Location within Poland
- Coordinates: 52°29′25″N 21°31′30″E
- Country: Poland
- Voivodeship: Masovian
- County: Wyszków
- Gmina: Zabrodzie

Karolinów [karɔˈlinuf] is a village in the administrative district of Gmina Zabrodzie, in Wyszków County, Masovian Voivodeship, in east-central Poland.
