= Gaj, Wyszków County =

Gaj
- Village
- Location within Poland
- Coordinates: 52°31′N 21°25′E
- Country: Poland
- Voivodeship: Masovian
- County: Wyszków
- Gmina: Zabrodzie

Gaj [ɡai̯] is a village in the administrative district of Gmina Zabrodzie, within Wyszków County, Masovian Voivodeship, in east-central Poland.
