= Przyjmy, Wyszków County =

Przyjmy
- Village
- Location within Poland
- Coordinates: 52°38′34″N 21°37′37″E
- Country: Poland
- Voivodeship: Masovian
- County: Wyszków
- Gmina: Brańszczyk

Przyjmy [ˈpʂɨi̯mɨ] is a village in the administrative district of Gmina Brańszczyk, within Wyszków County, Masovian Voivodeship, in east-central Poland.
