= Huta Podgórna, Masovian Voivodeship =

Huta Podgórna
- Village
- Location within Poland
- Coordinates: 52°33′10″N 21°10′12″E
- Country: Poland
- Voivodeship: Masovian
- County: Wyszków
- Gmina: Somianka

Huta Podgórna [ˈxuta pɔdˈɡurna] is a village in the administrative district of Gmina Somianka, within Wyszków County, Masovian Voivodeship, in east-central Poland.
