= Wielątki-Folwark =

- Village
- Location within Poland
- Coordinates: 52°39′03″N 21°18′40″E
- Country: Poland
- Voivodeship: Masovian
- County: Wyszków
- Gmina: Rząśnik

Wielątki-Folwark [vjɛˈlɔntki ˈfɔlvark] is a village in the administrative district of Gmina Rząśnik, within Wyszków County, Masovian Voivodeship, in east-central Poland.
