= Białebłoto-Stara Wieś =

- Village
- Location within Poland
- Coordinates: 52°42′16″N 21°37′04″E
- Country: Poland
- Voivodeship: Masovian
- County: Wyszków
- Gmina: Brańszczyk

Białebłoto-Stara Wieś [bjawɛˈbwɔtɔ ˈstara ˈvjɛɕ] is a village in the administrative district of Gmina Brańszczyk, within Wyszków County, Masovian Voivodeship, in east-central Poland.
