= Trzcianka, Wyszków County =

Trzcianka
- Village
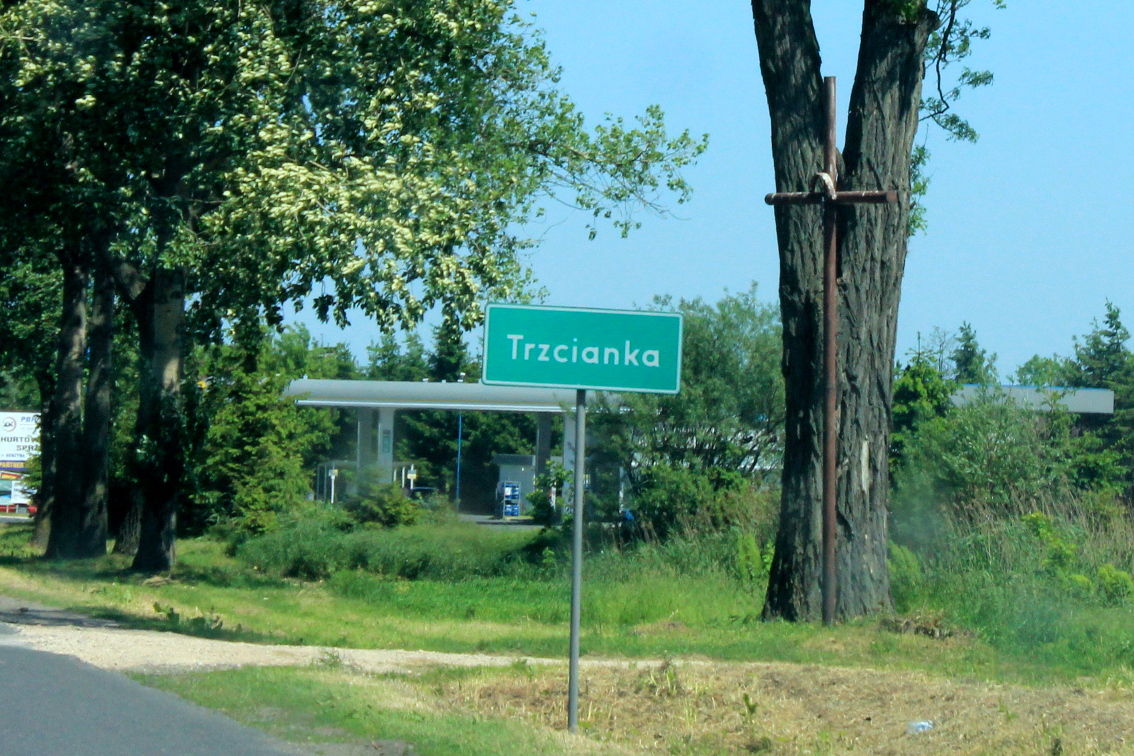

- Location within Poland
- Coordinates: 52°38′53″N 21°33′14″E
- Country: Poland
- Voivodeship: Masovian
- County: Wyszków
- Gmina: Brańszczyk
- Population: 1,200

Trzcianka [ˈtʂt͡ɕaŋka] is a village in the administrative district of Gmina Brańszczyk, within Wyszków County, Masovian Voivodeship, in east-central Poland.
