= Nowy Lubiel =

- Village
- Location within Poland
- Coordinates: 52°46′28″N 21°25′7″E
- Country: Poland
- Voivodeship: Masovian
- County: Wyszków
- Gmina: Rząśnik
- Population: 190

Nowy Lubiel [ˈnɔvɨ ˈlubjɛl] is a village in the administrative district of Gmina Rząśnik, within Wyszków County, Masovian Voivodeship, in east-central Poland.
