= Stefan Zawadzki =

Polish historian (born 1946)

Stefan Zawadzki (born 1946 in Jasieniec) is a Polish historian, a researcher of Ancient Near East history. He is a professor at Adam Mickiewicz University. He has written a number of monographs.
