= Stanisława Umińska =

Polish theatre actress (1901–1977)

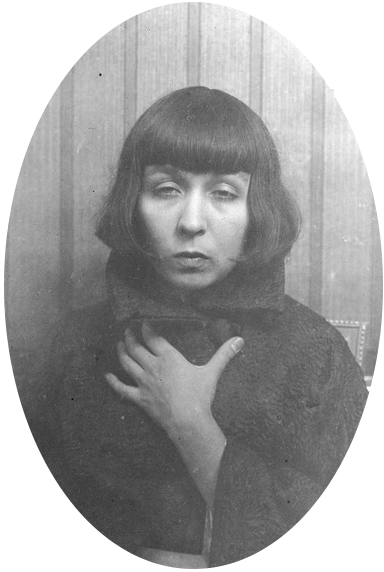
- Born: 17 November 1901; Warsaw, Congress Poland
- Died: 25 December 1977 (aged 76); Niegów, Polish People's Republic

Stanisława Umińska (17 November 1901 – 25 December 1977) was a Polish theatre actress.

Born in Warsaw, in early 1920s she was considered one of the rising stars of the Polish theatre, but in 1924 in Paris, France, she shot dead her dying fiance, artist Jan Żyznowski, upon his request as an act of euthanasia. Set free by the French court, she became a nurse and a nun in Poland. She died in Niegów, Poland on Christmas Day in 1977.

== Selected filmography ==
- Pan Twardowski (1921)
