= Poręba Średnia =

- Village
- Location within Poland
- Coordinates: 52°41′N 21°42′E
- Country: Poland
- Voivodeship: Masovian
- County: Wyszków
- Gmina: Brańszczyk

Poręba Średnia [pɔˈrɛmba ˈɕrɛdɲa] is a village in the administrative district of Gmina Brańszczyk, within Wyszków County, Masovian Voivodeship, in east-central Poland.
