= Prabuty, Masovian Voivodeship =

Prabuty
- Village
- Location within Poland
- Coordinates: 52°48′N 21°34′E
- Country: Poland
- Voivodeship: Masovian
- County: Wyszków
- Gmina: Długosiodło

Prabuty [praˈbutɨ] is a village in the administrative district of Gmina Długosiodło, within Wyszków County, Masovian Voivodeship, in east-central Poland.
