= Mostówka, Wyszków County =

Mostówka
- Village
- Location within Poland
- Coordinates: 52°31′N 21°27′E
- Country: Poland
- Voivodeship: Masovian
- County: Wyszków
- Gmina: Zabrodzie

Mostówka [mɔsˈtufka] (German: Mostauken) is a village in the administrative district of Gmina Zabrodzie, within Wyszków County, Masovian Voivodeship, in east-central Poland.
