= Ostrówek, Wyszków County =

Ostrówek
- Village
- Location within Poland
- Coordinates: 52°45′24″N 21°25′11″E
- Country: Poland
- Voivodeship: Masovian
- County: Wyszków
- Gmina: Rząśnik
- Time zone: UTC+1 (CET)
  - Summer (DST): UTC+2 (CEST)

Ostrówek [ɔsˈtruvɛk] is a village in the administrative district of Gmina Rząśnik, within Wyszków County, Masovian Voivodeship, in east-central Poland.

Three Polish citizens were murdered by Nazi Germany in the village during World War II.
