= Białebłoto-Kobyla =

- Village
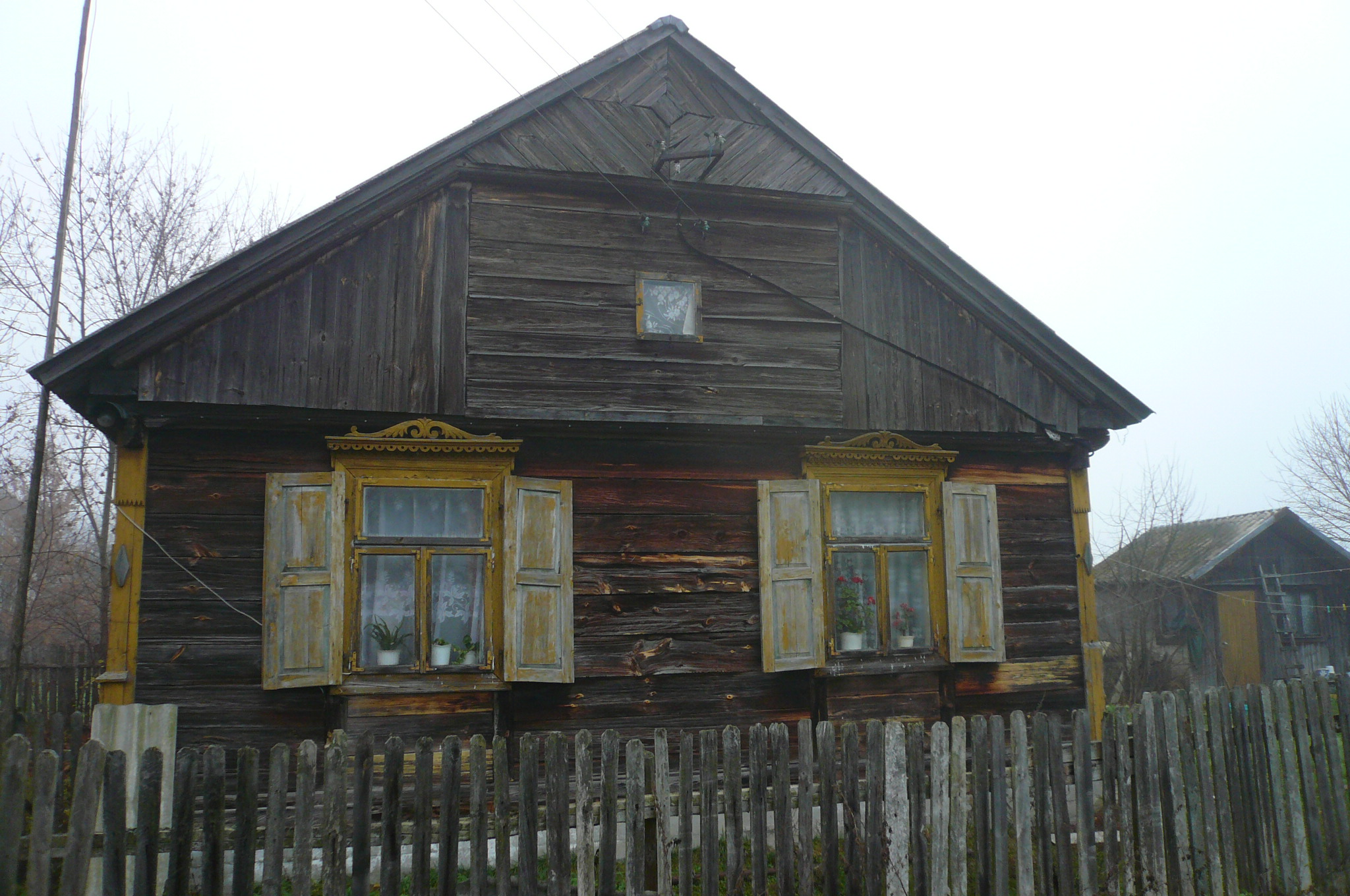

- Location within Poland
- Coordinates: 52°42′29″N 21°36′25″E
- Country: Poland
- Voivodeship: Masovian
- County: Wyszków
- Gmina: Brańszczyk

Białebłoto-Kobyla [bjawɛˈbwɔtɔ kɔˈbɨla] is a village in the administrative district of Gmina Brańszczyk, within Wyszków County, Masovian Voivodeship, in east-central Poland.
