= Znamiączki =

- Village
- Location within Poland
- Coordinates: 52°47′33″N 21°32′34″E
- Country: Poland
- Voivodeship: Masovian
- County: Wyszków
- Gmina: Długosiodło

Znamiączki [znaˈmjɔnt͡ʂki] is a village in the administrative district of Gmina Długosiodło, within Wyszków County, Masovian Voivodeship, in east-central Poland.
