= Nowe Wielątki =

Village in Gmina Rząśnik, Poland

- Village
- Location within Poland
- Coordinates: 52°38′55″N 21°20′04″E
- Country: Poland
- Voivodeship: Masovian
- County: Wyszków
- Gmina: Rząśnik

Nowe Wielątki [ˈnɔvɛ vjɛˈlɔntki] is a village in the administrative district of Gmina Rząśnik, within Wyszków County, Masovian Voivodeship, in east-central Poland.
