= Kiciny =

- Village
- Location within Poland
- Coordinates: 52°31′N 21°30′E
- Country: Poland
- Voivodeship: Masovian
- County: Wyszków
- Gmina: Zabrodzie
- Time zone: UTC+1 (CET)
  - Summer (DST): UTC+2 (CEST)

Kiciny [kiˈt͡ɕinɨ] is a village in the administrative district of Gmina Zabrodzie, within Wyszków County, Masovian Voivodeship, in east-central Poland.

Nine Polish citizens were murdered by Nazi Germany in the village during World War II.
