= Dalekie, Wyszków County =

Dalekie
- Village
- Location within Poland
- Coordinates: 52°43′06″N 21°32′50″E
- Country: Poland
- Voivodeship: Masovian
- County: Wyszków
- Gmina: Długosiodło

Dalekie [daˈlɛkʲɛ] is a village in the administrative district of Gmina Długosiodło, within Wyszków County, Masovian Voivodeship, in east-central Poland.
