= Turzyn, Masovian Voivodeship =

Turzyn
- Village
- Location within Poland
- Coordinates: 52°37′N 21°31′E
- Country: Poland
- Voivodeship: Masovian
- County: Wyszków
- Gmina: Brańszczyk
- Population: 1,100

Turzyn [ˈtuʐɨn] is a village in the administrative district of Gmina Brańszczyk, within Wyszków County, Masovian Voivodeship, in east-central Poland.
