= Chrzczanka Włościańska =

- Village
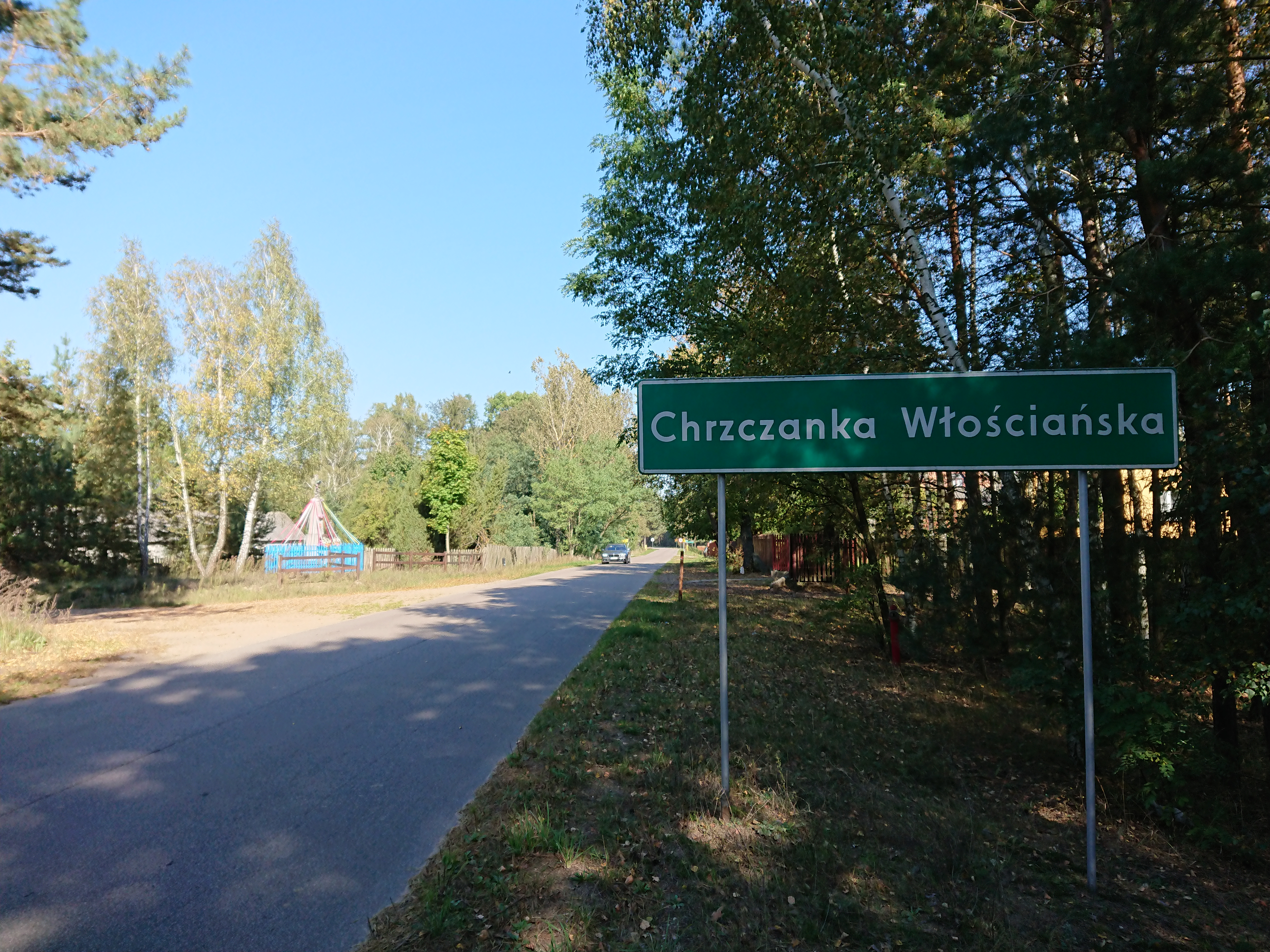
- Entrance to the Village of Chrzczanka Włościańska

- Location within Poland
- Coordinates: 52°46′39″N 21°30′40″E
- Country: Poland
- Voivodeship: Masovian
- County: Wyszków
- Gmina: Długosiodło

Chrzczanka Włościańska (Polish pronunciation: [ˈxʂtʂaŋka vwɔɕˈtɕaj̃ska]) is a village in the administrative district of Gmina Długosiodło, within Wyszków County, Masovian Voivodeship, in east-central Poland.
