= Grądy Szlacheckie =

- Village
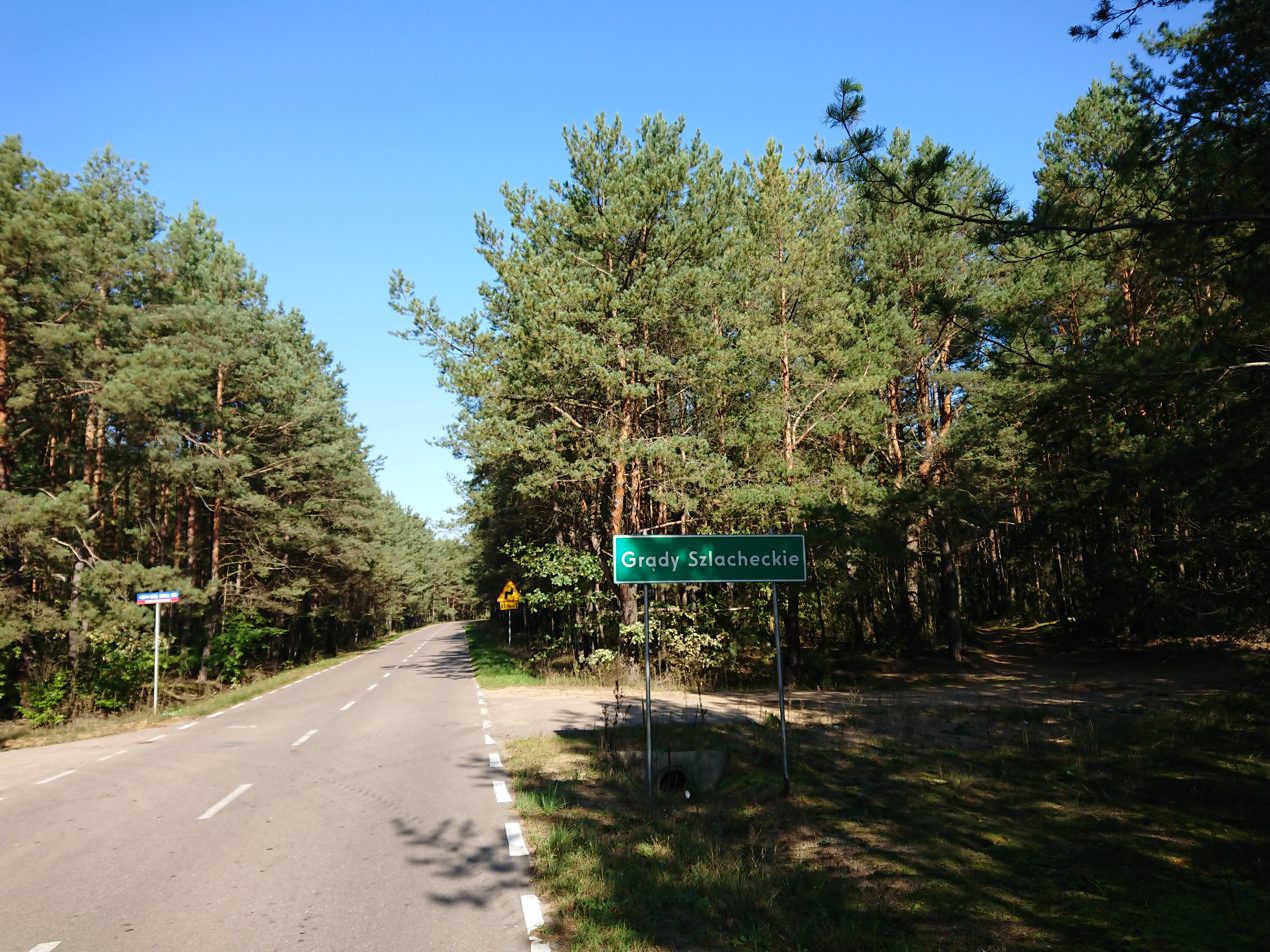
- Entrance to Grady Szlachecki village, Poland

- Location within Poland
- Coordinates: 52°47′58″N 21°31′17″E
- Country: Poland
- Voivodeship: Masovian
- County: Wyszków
- Gmina: Długosiodło

Grądy Szlacheckie [ˈɡrɔndɨ ʂlaˈxɛt͡skʲɛ] is a village in the administrative district of Gmina Długosiodło, within Wyszków County, Masovian Voivodeship, in east-central Poland.
