= Celinowo, Masovian Voivodeship =

Celinowo
- Village
- Location within Poland
- Coordinates: 52°33′40″N 21°13′34″E
- Country: Poland
- Voivodeship: Masovian
- County: Wyszków
- Gmina: Somianka

Celinowo [t͡sɛliˈnɔvɔ] is a village in the administrative district of Gmina Somianka, within Wyszków County, Masovian Voivodeship, in east-central Poland.
