= Olszaki =

- Village
- Location within Poland
- Coordinates: 52°45′32″N 21°30′08″E
- Country: Poland
- Voivodeship: Masovian
- County: Wyszków
- Gmina: Długosiodło

Olszaki [ɔlˈʂaki] is a village in the administrative district of Gmina Długosiodło, within Wyszków County, Masovian Voivodeship, in east-central Poland.
