= Dąbrowa, Wyszków County =

Dąbrowa
- Village
- Location within Poland
- Coordinates: 52°41′20″N 21°21′39″E
- Country: Poland
- Voivodeship: Masovian
- County: Wyszków
- Gmina: Rząśnik

Dąbrowa [dɔmˈbrɔva] is a village in the administrative district of Gmina Rząśnik, within Wyszków County, Masovian Voivodeship, in east-central Poland.
