= Małaszek =

- Village
- Location within Poland
- Coordinates: 52°48′23″N 21°36′41″E
- Country: Poland
- Voivodeship: Masovian
- County: Wyszków
- Gmina: Długosiodło
- Time zone: UTC+1 (CET)
  - Summer (DST): UTC+2 (CEST)
- Vehicle registration: WWY

Małaszek [maˈwaʂɛk] is a village in the administrative district of Gmina Długosiodło, within Wyszków County, Masovian Voivodeship, in east-central Poland.

== History ==
During the German occupation of Poland (World War II), on August 31, 1944, German troops carried out a massacre of over 30 Poles, including two partisans, near the village. It was one of several pacifications perpetrated in the area in retaliation for German losses suffered in the battles of Jarząbka and Pecynka, which were fought nearby against the Polish Home Army.
