= Ulasek, Wyszków County =

Ulasek
- Village
- Location within Poland
- Coordinates: 52°35′N 21°17′E
- Country: Poland
- Voivodeship: Masovian
- County: Wyszków
- Gmina: Somianka

Ulasek [uˈlasɛk] is a village in the administrative district of Gmina Somianka, within Wyszków County, Masovian Voivodeship, in east-central Poland.
