= Obrąb, Wyszków County =

Obrąb
- Village
- Location within Poland
- Coordinates: 52°30′N 21°30′E
- Country: Poland
- Voivodeship: Masovian
- County: Wyszków
- Gmina: Zabrodzie

Obrąb [ˈɔbrɔmp] is a village in the administrative district of Gmina Zabrodzie, within Wyszków County, Masovian Voivodeship, in east-central Poland.
