= Grodziczno, Masovian Voivodeship =

Grodziczno
- Village
- Location within Poland
- Coordinates: 52°45′18″N 21°27′33″E
- Country: Poland
- Voivodeship: Masovian
- County: Wyszków
- Gmina: Rząśnik

Grodziczno [ɡrɔˈd͡ʑit͡ʂnɔ] is a village in the administrative district of Gmina Rząśnik, within Wyszków County, Masovian Voivodeship, in east-central Poland.
