= Wólka Lubielska =

- Village
- Location within Poland
- Coordinates: 52°46′N 21°24′E
- Country: Poland
- Voivodeship: Masovian
- County: Wyszków
- Gmina: Rząśnik

Wólka Lubielska [ˈvulka luˈbjɛlska] is a village in the administrative district of Gmina Rząśnik, within Wyszków County, Masovian Voivodeship, in east-central Poland.
