= Wólka-Wojciechówek =

- Village
- Location within Poland
- Coordinates: 52°46′13″N 21°22′57″E
- Country: Poland
- Voivodeship: Masovian
- County: Wyszków
- Gmina: Rząśnik

Wólka-Wojciechówek (Polish pronunciation: [ˈvulka vɔjt͡ɕɛˈxuvɛk]) is a village in the administrative district of Gmina Rząśnik, within Wyszków County, Masovian Voivodeship, in east-central Poland.
