= Jaszczułty =

- Village
- Location within Poland
- Coordinates: 52°43′N 21°31′E
- Country: Poland
- Voivodeship: Masovian
- County: Wyszków
- Gmina: Długosiodło
- Population: 520
- Time zone: CET( UTC+1 )
  - Summer (DST): CEST( UTC+2 )

Jaszczułty (IPA: [jaʂˈt͡ʂuu̯tɨ]) is a village in the administrative district of Gmina Długosiodło, within Wyszków County, Masovian Voivodeship, in east-central Poland.
