= Jackowo Górne =

- Village
- Location within Poland
- Coordinates: 52°33′N 21°15′E
- Country: Poland
- Voivodeship: Masovian
- County: Wyszków
- Gmina: Somianka

Jackowo Górne [jat͡sˈkɔvɔ ˈɡurnɛ] is a village in the administrative district of Gmina Somianka, within Wyszków County, Masovian Voivodeship, in east-central Poland.
