= Przykory, Wyszków County =

Przykory
- Village
- Location within Poland
- Coordinates: 52°29′N 21°29′E
- Country: Poland
- Voivodeship: Masovian
- County: Wyszków
- Gmina: Zabrodzie
- Population: 180

Przykory [pʂɨˈkɔrɨ] is a village in the administrative district of Gmina Zabrodzie, within Wyszków County, Masovian Voivodeship, in east-central Poland.

Przykory was a private noble village in the second half of the 16th century, located in Kamieniec County, Nur Land, Masovian Voivodeship of the Polish–Lithuanian Commonwealth.
