= Wysychy =

- Village
- Location within Poland
- Coordinates: 52°29′N 21°24′E
- Country: Poland
- Voivodeship: Masovian
- County: Wyszków
- Gmina: Zabrodzie

Wysychy [vɨˈsɨxɨ] is a village in the administrative district of Gmina Zabrodzie, within Wyszków County, Masovian Voivodeship, in east-central Poland.
