= Basinów, Wyszków County =

Basinów
- Village
- Location within Poland
- Coordinates: 52°31′38″N 21°33′1″E
- Country: Poland
- Voivodeship: Masovian
- County: Wyszków
- Gmina: Zabrodzie
- Population: 124 (2,021)

Basinów [baˈɕinuf] is a village in the administrative district of Gmina Zabrodzie, within Wyszków County, Masovian Voivodeship, in east-central Poland.
