= Porządzie =

- Village
- Location within Poland
- Coordinates: 52°42′N 21°26′E
- Country: Poland
- Voivodeship: Masovian
- County: Wyszków
- Gmina: Rząśnik
- Population: 690

Porządzie [pɔˈʐɔnd͡ʑɛ] is a village in the administrative district of Gmina Rząśnik, within Wyszków County, Masovian Voivodeship, in east-central Poland.
