= Popowo-Letnisko =

- Village
- Location within Poland
- Coordinates: 52°32′45″N 21°8′1″E
- Country: Poland
- Voivodeship: Masovian
- County: Wyszków
- Gmina: Somianka
- Population: 80

Popowo-Letnisko [pɔˈpɔvɔ lɛtˈniskɔ] is a village in the administrative district of Gmina Somianka, within Wyszków County, Masovian Voivodeship, in east-central Poland.
