= Podgać =

- Village
- Location within Poland
- Coordinates: 52°31′55″N 21°31′51″E
- Country: Poland
- Voivodeship: Masovian
- County: Wyszków
- Gmina: Zabrodzie

Podgać [ˈpɔdɡat͡ɕ] is a village in the administrative district of Gmina Zabrodzie, within Wyszków County, Masovian Voivodeship, in east-central Poland.
