= Somianka-Parcele =

- Village
- Location within Poland
- Coordinates: 52°33′34″N 21°16′55″E
- Country: Poland
- Voivodeship: Masovian
- County: Wyszków
- Gmina: Somianka

Somianka-Parcele [sɔˈmjaŋka parˈt͡sɛlɛ] is a village in the administrative district of Gmina Somianka, within Wyszków County, Masovian Voivodeship, in east-central Poland.
