= Michalin, Wyszków County =

Michalin
- Village
- Location within Poland
- Coordinates: 52°34′N 21°19′E
- Country: Poland
- Voivodeship: Masovian
- County: Wyszków
- Gmina: Somianka

Michalin [miˈxalin] is a village in the administrative district of Gmina Somianka, within Wyszków County, Masovian Voivodeship, in east-central Poland.
