= Lipiny, Wyszków County =

Lipiny
- Village
- Location within Poland
- Coordinates: 52°28′41″N 21°26′27″E
- Country: Poland
- Voivodeship: Masovian
- County: Wyszków
- Gmina: Zabrodzie

Lipiny [liˈpinɨ] is a village in the administrative district of Gmina Zabrodzie, within Wyszków County, Masovian Voivodeship, in east-central Poland.
