= Chrzczanka-Folwark =

- Village
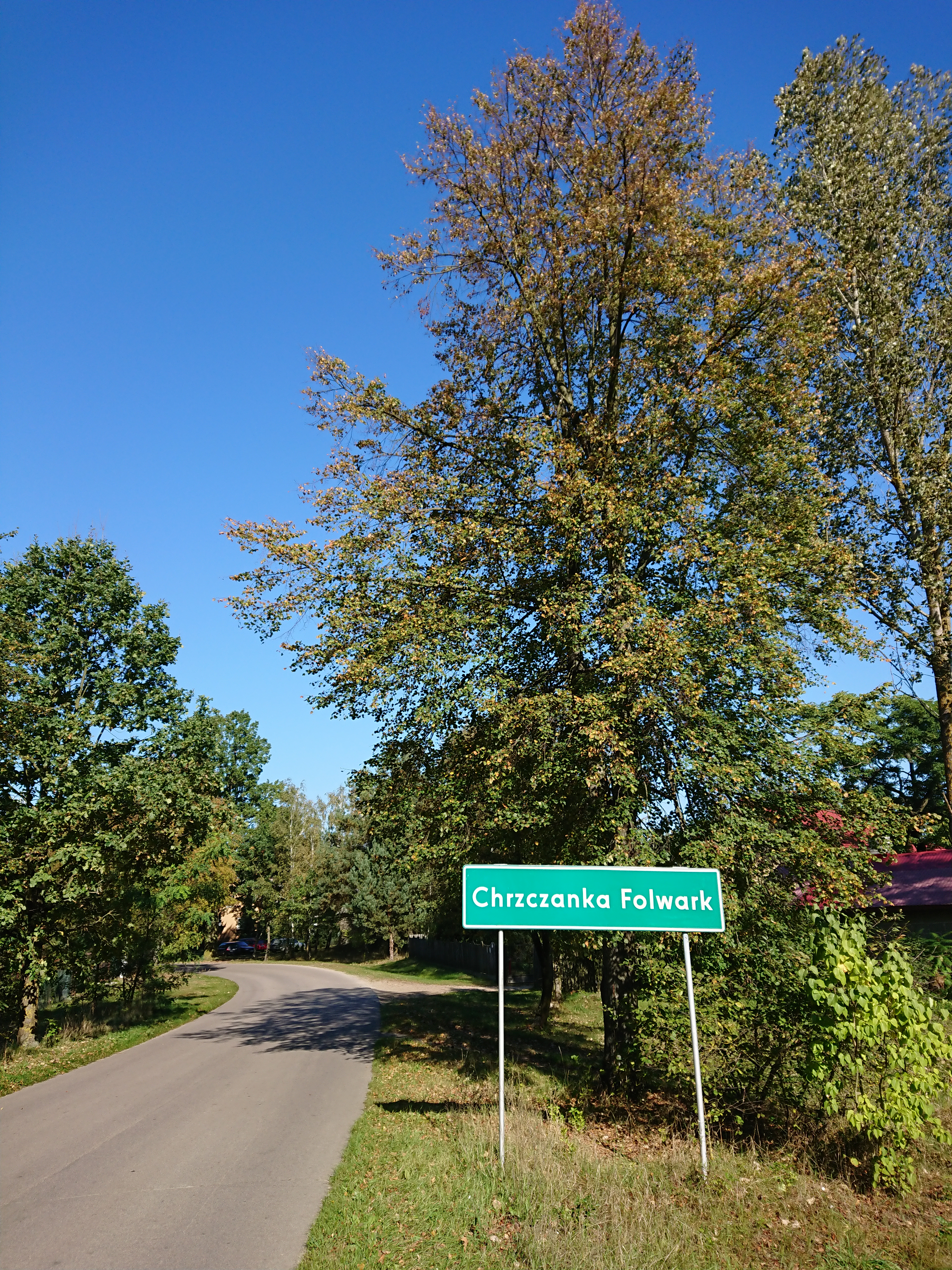
- Entrance to Chrzczanka-Folwark village, Długosiodło, Poland

- Location within Poland
- Coordinates: 52°46′46″N 21°31′28″E
- Country: Poland
- Voivodeship: Masovian
- County: Wyszków
- Gmina: Długosiodło

Chrzczanka-Folwark (Polish pronunciation: [ˈxʂtʂaŋka ˈfɔlvark]) is a village in the administrative district of Gmina Długosiodło, within Wyszków County, Masovian Voivodeship, in east-central Poland.
