= Kręgi, Wyszków County =

Kręgi
- Village
- Location within Poland
- Coordinates: 52°34′N 21°21′E
- Country: Poland
- Voivodeship: Masovian
- County: Wyszków
- Gmina: Somianka
- Population: 370

Kręgi [ˈkrɛnɡi] is a village in the administrative district of Gmina Somianka, within Wyszków County, Masovian Voivodeship, in east-central Poland.
