= Blochy =

- Village
- Location within Poland
- Coordinates: 52°44′16″N 21°36′10″E
- Country: Poland
- Voivodeship: Masovian
- County: Wyszków
- Gmina: Długosiodło

Blochy [ˈblɔxɨ] is a village in the administrative district of Gmina Długosiodło, within Wyszków County, Masovian Voivodeship, in east-central Poland.
