= Nowe Budy, Wyszków County =

Nowe Budy
- Village
- Location within Poland
- Coordinates: 52°38′21″N 21°39′37″E
- Country: Poland
- Voivodeship: Masovian
- County: Wyszków
- Gmina: Brańszczyk

Nowe Budy [ˈnɔvɛ ˈbudɨ] is a village in the administrative district of Gmina Brańszczyk, within Wyszków County, Masovian Voivodeship, in east-central Poland.
