= Wólka Somiankowska =

- Village
- Location within Poland
- Coordinates: 52°35′9″N 21°18′51″E
- Country: Poland
- Voivodeship: Masovian
- County: Wyszków
- Gmina: Somianka

Wólka Somiankowska [ˈvulka sɔmjaŋˈkɔfska] is a village in the administrative district of Gmina Somianka, within Wyszków County, Masovian Voivodeship, in east-central Poland.
