= Zalas, Wyszków County =

Zalas
- Village
- Location within Poland
- Coordinates: 52°44′8″N 21°37′29″E
- Country: Poland
- Voivodeship: Masovian
- County: Wyszków
- Gmina: Długosiodło

Zalas [ˈzalas] is a village in the administrative district of Gmina Długosiodło, within Wyszków County, Masovian Voivodeship, in east-central Poland.
