= Wólka-Folwark, Masovian Voivodeship =

Wólka-Folwark
- Village
- Location within Poland
- Coordinates: 52°40′23″N 21°18′38″E
- Country: Poland
- Voivodeship: Masovian
- County: Wyszków
- Gmina: Rząśnik

Wólka-Folwark [ˈvulka ˈfɔlvark] is a village in the administrative district of Gmina Rząśnik, within Wyszków County, Masovian Voivodeship, in east-central Poland.
