= Jackowo Dolne =

- Village
- Location within Poland
- Coordinates: 52°31′N 21°12′E
- Country: Poland
- Voivodeship: Masovian
- County: Wyszków
- Gmina: Somianka

Jackowo Dolne [jat͡sˈkɔvɔ ˈdɔlnɛ] is a village in the administrative district of Gmina Somianka, within Wyszków County, Masovian Voivodeship, in east-central Poland.
