= Popowo-Parcele =

- Village
- Location within Poland
- Coordinates: 52°31′45″N 21°10′14″E
- Country: Poland
- Voivodeship: Masovian
- County: Wyszków
- Gmina: Somianka
- Population: 100

Popowo-Parcele [pɔˈpɔvɔ parˈt͡sɛlɛ] is a village in the administrative district of Gmina Somianka, within Wyszków County, Masovian Voivodeship(province), in east-central Poland.
