= Wólka Grochowa =

- Village
- Location within Poland
- Coordinates: 52°47′56″N 21°35′45″E
- Country: Poland
- Voivodeship: Masovian
- County: Wyszków
- Gmina: Długosiodło

Wólka Grochowa [ˈvulka ɡrɔˈxɔva] is a village in the administrative district of Gmina Długosiodło, within Wyszków County, Masovian Voivodeship, in north-central Poland. Its postal code is 07210.
