= Somianka =

- Village
- Location within Poland
- Coordinates: 52°34′N 21°18′E
- Country: Poland
- Voivodeship: Masovian
- County: Wyszków
- Gmina: Somianka
- Population: 510

Somianka [sɔˈmjanka] is a village in Wyszków County, Masovian Voivodeship, in east-central Poland. It is the seat of the gmina (administrative district) called Gmina Somianka.
