= Brańszczyk =

Brańszczyk Nad Bugiem
- Village
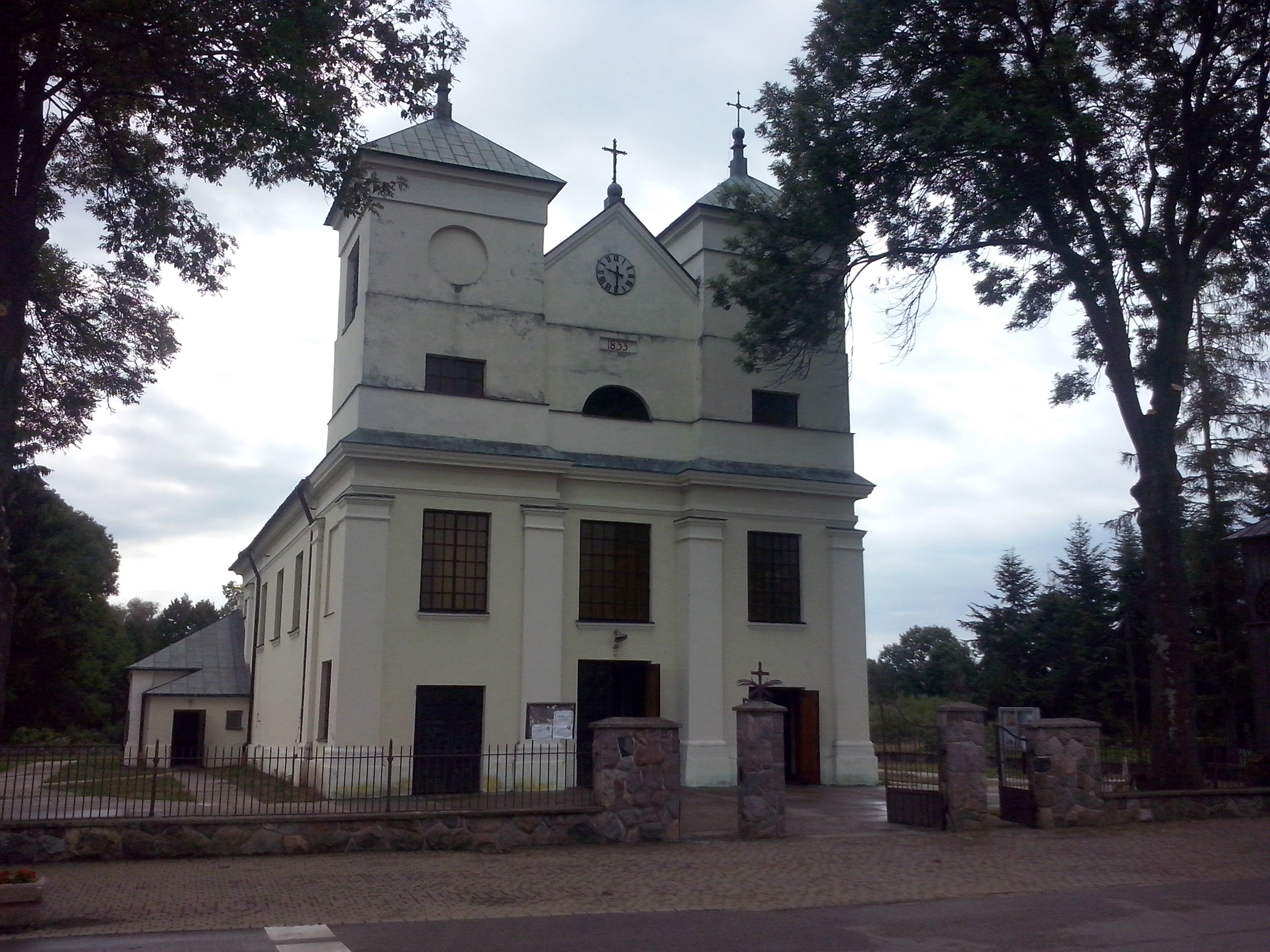
- Church of the Assumption of the Blessed Virgin Mary

- Coat of arms

- Location within Poland
- Coordinates: 52°38′N 21°36′E
- Country: Poland
- Voivodeship: Masovian
- County: Wyszków
- Gmina: Brańszczyk

Population
  - Total: 1,109

Brańszczyk [ˈbraɲʂt͡ʂɨk] is a village in Wyszków County, Masovian Voivodeship, in east-central Poland. It is the seat of the gmina (administrative district) called Gmina Brańszczyk.
