= Gmina Brańszczyk =

Gmina Brańszczyk Brańszczyk Commune
- Gmina
- Coat of arms

- Location within Poland
- Coordinates (Brańszczyk): 52°38′N 21°36′E
- Country: Poland
- Voivodeship: Masovian
- County: Wyszków
- Seat: Brańszczyk

Area
  - Total: 167.61 km^{2} (64.71 sq mi)

Population (2013)
  - Total: 8,428
  - Density: 50.28/km^{2} (130.2/sq mi)
- Website: http://www.branszczyk.pl/

Gmina Brańszczyk is a rural gmina (administrative district) in Wyszków County, Masovian Voivodeship, in east-central Poland. Its seat is the village of Brańszczyk, which lies approximately 11 kilometres (7 mi) north-east of Wyszków and 62 km (39 mi) north-east of Warsaw.

The gmina covers an area of 167.61 square kilometres (64.7 sq mi), and as of 2006 its total population is 8,408 (8,428 in 2013).

== Villages ==
Gmina Brańszczyk contains the villages and settlements of Białebłoto-Kobyla, Białebłoto-Kurza, Białebłoto-Nowa Wieś, Białebłoto-Stara Wieś, Brańszczyk, Budykierz, Dalekie-Tartak, Dudowizna, Knurowiec, Niemiry, Nowe Budy, Nowy Brańszczyk, Ojcowizna, Poręba Średnia, Poręba-Kocęby, Przyjmy, Stare Budy, Trzcianka, Tuchlin, Turzyn, Udrzyn and Udrzynek.

== Neighbouring gminas ==
Gmina Brańszczyk is bordered by the gminas of Brok, Długosiodło, Łochów, Małkinia Górna, Ostrów Mazowiecka, Rząśnik, Sadowne and Wyszków.
