= Zabrodzie, Wyszków County =

Zabrodzie
- Village
- Location within Poland
- Coordinates: 52°30′16″N 21°25′4″E
- Country: Poland
- Voivodeship: Masovian
- County: Wyszków
- Gmina: Zabrodzie
- Population: 590

Zabrodzie [zaˈbrɔd͡ʑɛ] is a village in Wyszków County, Masovian Voivodeship, in east-central Poland. It is the seat of the gmina (administrative district) called Gmina Zabrodzie.
