= Gmina Somianka =

Gmina Somianka Somianka Commune
- Gmina
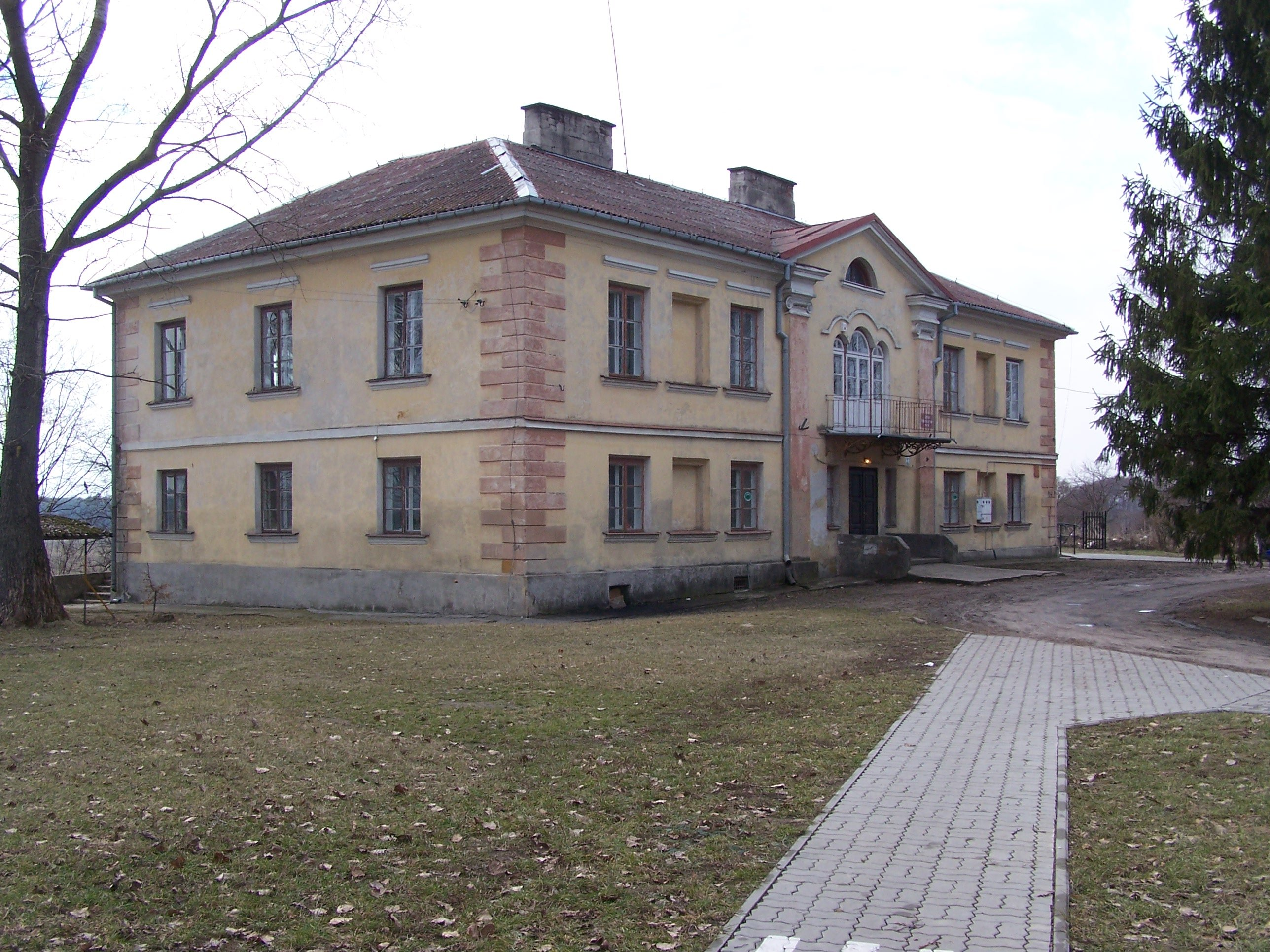
- Kregi-Leski Estate-2006-04-02

- Flag Coat of arms

- Location within Poland
- Coordinates (Somianka): 52°34′N 21°18′E
- Country: Poland
- Voivodeship: Masovian
- County: Wyszków
- Seat: Somianka

Area
  - Total: 116.38 km^{2} (44.93 sq mi)

Population (2013)
  - Total: 5,591
  - Density: 48.04/km^{2} (124.4/sq mi)
- Website: http://www.somianka.pl

Gmina Somianka is a rural gmina (administrative district) in Wyszków County, Masovian Voivodeship, in east-central Poland. Its seat is the village of Somianka, which lies approximately 12 kilometres (7 mi) west of Wyszków and 44 km (27 mi) north-east of Warsaw.

The gmina covers an area of 116.38 square kilometres (44.9 sq mi), and as of 2006 its total population is 5,491 (5,591 in 2013).

== Villages ==
Gmina Somianka contains the villages and settlements of:

- Barcice
- Celinowo
- Henrysin
- Huta Podgórna
- Jackowo Dolne
- Jackowo Górne
- Janki
- Jasieniec
- Kręgi
- Michalin
- Nowe Kozłowo
- Nowe Płudy
- Nowe Wypychy
- Ostrowy
- Popowo-Letnisko
- Popowo-Parcele
- Skorki
- Somianka (including the sołectwo of Somianka-Parcele)
- Stare Kozłowo
- Stare Płudy
- Stare Wypychy
- Stary Mystkówiec
- Suwin
- Ulasek
- Wielątki Rosochate
- Wielęcin
- Wola Mystkowska
- Wólka Somiankowska
- Zdziebórz

== Neighbouring gminas ==
Gmina Somianka is bordered by the gminas of Dąbrówka, Rząśnik, Serock, Wyszków and Zatory.
