= Młynarze, Wyszków County =

Młynarze
- Village
- Location within Poland
- Coordinates: 52°32′N 21°22′E
- Country: Poland
- Voivodeship: Masovian
- County: Wyszków
- Gmina: Zabrodzie

Population (approx.)
  - Total: 70
- Time zone: UTC+1 (CET)
  - Summer (DST): UTC+2 (CEST)

Młynarze [mwɨˈnaʐɛ] is a village in the administrative district of Gmina Zabrodzie, within Wyszków County, Masovian Voivodeship, in east-central Poland.

Two Polish citizens were murdered by Nazi Germany in the village during World War II.
