= Gmina Długosiodło =

Gmina Długosiodło Długosiodło Commune
- Gmina
- Coat of arms

- Location within Poland
- Coordinates (Długosiodło): 52°46′N 21°35′E
- Country: Poland
- Voivodeship: Masovian
- County: Wyszków
- Seat: Długosiodło

Area
  - Total: 167.45 km^{2} (64.65 sq mi)

Population (2013)
  - Total: 7,922
  - Density: 47.31/km^{2} (122.5/sq mi)
- Website: http://www.dlugosiodlo.pl/

Gmina Długosiodło is a rural gmina (administrative district) in Wyszków County, Masovian Voivodeship, in east-central Poland. Its seat is the village of Długosiodło, which lies approximately 21 kilometres (13 mi) north-east of Wyszków and 73 km (45 mi) north-east of Warsaw.

The gmina covers an area of 167.45 square kilometres (64.7 sq mi), and as of 2006 its total population is 7,649 (7,922 in 2013).

== Villages ==
Gmina Długosiodło contains the villages and settlements of Adamowo, Augustowo, Blochy, Budy-Przetycz, Chorchosy, Chrzczanka Włościańska, Chrzczanka-Folwark, Dalekie, Dębienica, Długosiodło, Grądy Szlacheckie, Grądy Zalewne, Jaszczułty, Kalinowo, Kornaciska, Łączka, Lipniak-Majorat, Małaszek, Marianowo, Nowa Pecyna, Nowa Wieś, Nowe Bosewo, Olszaki, Ostrykół Dworski, Ostrykół Włościański, Plewki, Prabuty, Przetycz Włościańska, Przetycz-Folwark, Sieczychy, Stara Pecyna, Stare Bosewo, Stare Suski, Stasin, Wólka Grochowa, Wólka Piaseczna, Zalas, Zamość, Znamiączki and Zygmuntowo.

== Neighbouring gminas ==
Gmina Długosiodło is bordered by the gminas of Brańszczyk, Goworowo, Ostrów Mazowiecka, Rząśnik, Rzewnie and Wąsewo.
