= Rząśnik, Wyszków County =

Rząśnik
- Village
- Location within Poland
- Coordinates: 52°42′N 21°22′E
- Country: Poland
- Voivodeship: Masovian
- County: Wyszków
- Gmina: Rząśnik
- Population: 1,300

Rząśnik (Polish pronunciation: [ˈʐɔ̃ɕɲik]) is a village in Wyszków County, Masovian Voivodeship, in east-central Poland. It is the seat of the gmina (administrative district) called Gmina Rząśnik.
