= Jasieniec, Wyszków County =

Jasieniec
- Village
- Location within Poland
- Coordinates: 52°32′40″N 21°16′27″E
- Country: Poland
- Voivodeship: Masovian
- County: Wyszków
- Gmina: Somianka

Jasieniec [jaˈɕɛɲɛt͡s] is a village in the administrative district of Gmina Somianka, within Wyszków County, Masovian Voivodeship, in east-central Poland.
