= Barcice, Masovian Voivodeship =

Barcice
- Village
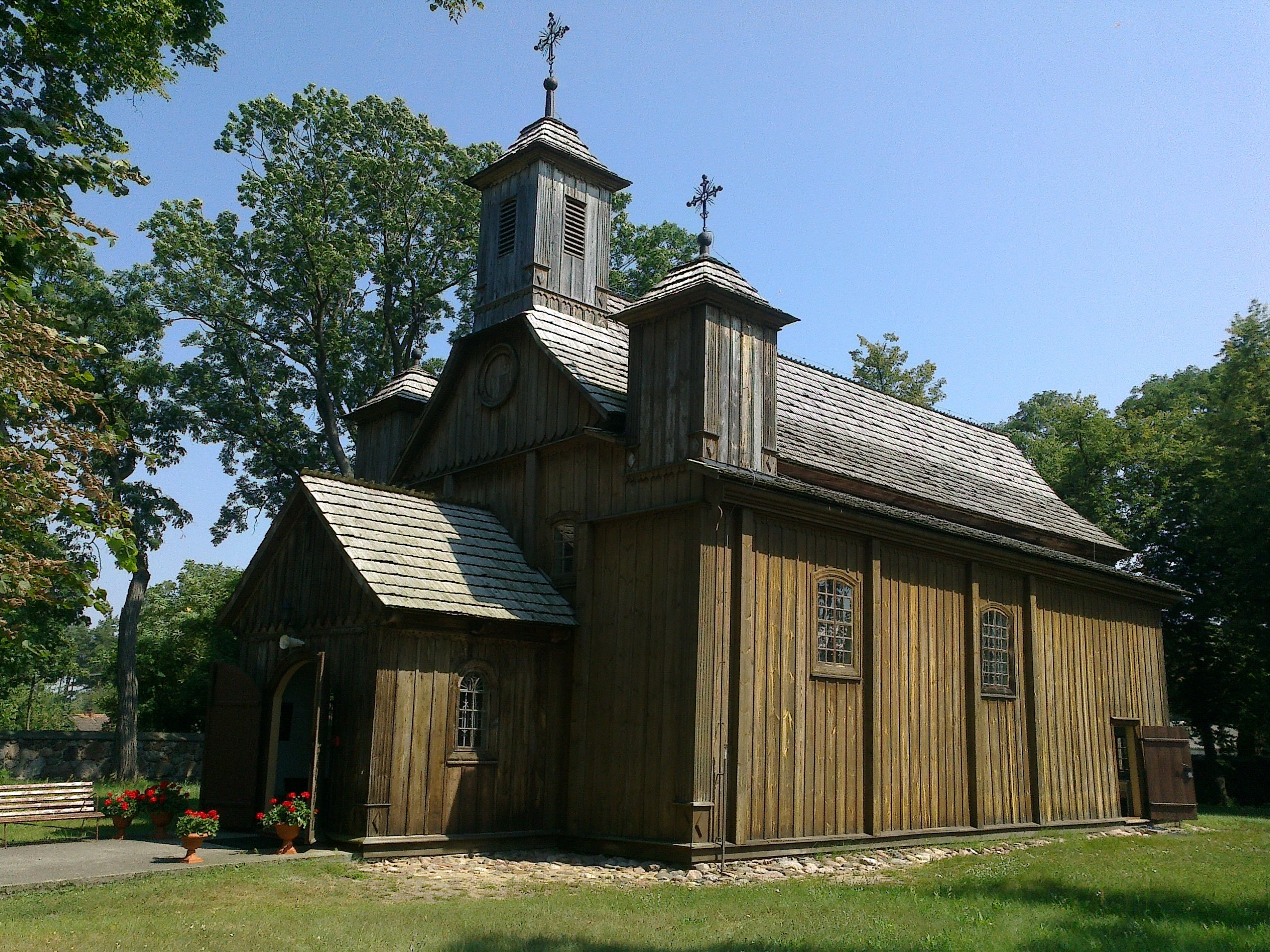
- Saint Stanislaus church in Barcice

- Location within Poland
- Coordinates: 52°32′14″N 21°15′45″E
- Country: Poland
- Voivodeship: Masovian
- County: Wyszków
- Gmina: Somianka
- Population: 250

Barcice (Polish pronunciation: [barˈt͡ɕit͡sɛ]) is a village in the administrative district of Gmina Somianka, within Wyszków County, Masovian Voivodeship, in east-central Poland.
