= Choszczowe =

- Village
- Location within Poland
- Coordinates: 52°30′40″N 21°28′29″E
- Country: Poland
- Voivodeship: Masovian
- County: Wyszków
- Gmina: Zabrodzie
- Population (2021): 202

Choszczowe [xɔʂˈt͡ʂɔvɛ] is a village in the administrative district of Gmina Zabrodzie, within Wyszków County, Masovian Voivodeship, in east-central Poland.
