= Gmina Rząśnik =

Gmina Rząśnik Rząśnik Commune
- Gmina
- Flag Coat of arms

- Location within Poland
- Coordinates (Rząśnik): 52°42′N 21°22′E
- Country: Poland
- Voivodeship: Masovian
- County: Wyszków
- Seat: Rząśnik

Area
  - Total: 167.42 km^{2} (64.64 sq mi)

Population (2013)
  - Total: 6,965
  - Density: 41.60/km^{2} (107.7/sq mi)
- Website: http://www.rzasnik.pl

Gmina Rząśnik is a rural gmina (administrative district) in Wyszków County, Masovian Voivodeship, in east-central Poland. Its seat is the village of Rząśnik, which lies approximately 14 kilometres (9 mi) north-west of Wyszków and 60 km (37 mi) north-east of Warsaw.

The gmina covers an area of 167.42 square kilometres (64.6 sq mi), and as of 2006 its total population is 6,603 (6,965 in 2013).

== Villages ==
Gmina Rząśnik contains the villages and settlements of Bielino, Dąbrowa, Gołystok, Grądy Polewne, Grodziczno, Janowo, Józefowo, Komorowo, Nowa Wieś, Nowe Wielątki, Nowy Lubiel, Nury, Ochudno, Osiny, Ostrówek, Plewica, Porządzie, Rogóźno, Rząśnik, Stary Lubiel, Wielątki, Wielątki-Folwark, Wincentowo, Wola Polewna, Wólka Lubielska, Wólka-Folwark, Wólka-Przekory and Wólka-Wojciechówek.

== Neighbouring gminas ==
Gmina Rząśnik is bordered by the gminas of Brańszczyk, Długosiodło, Obryte, Rzewnie, Somianka, Wyszków and Zatory.

== Bibliography ==
- Polish official population figures 2006
