= Długosiodło =

- Village
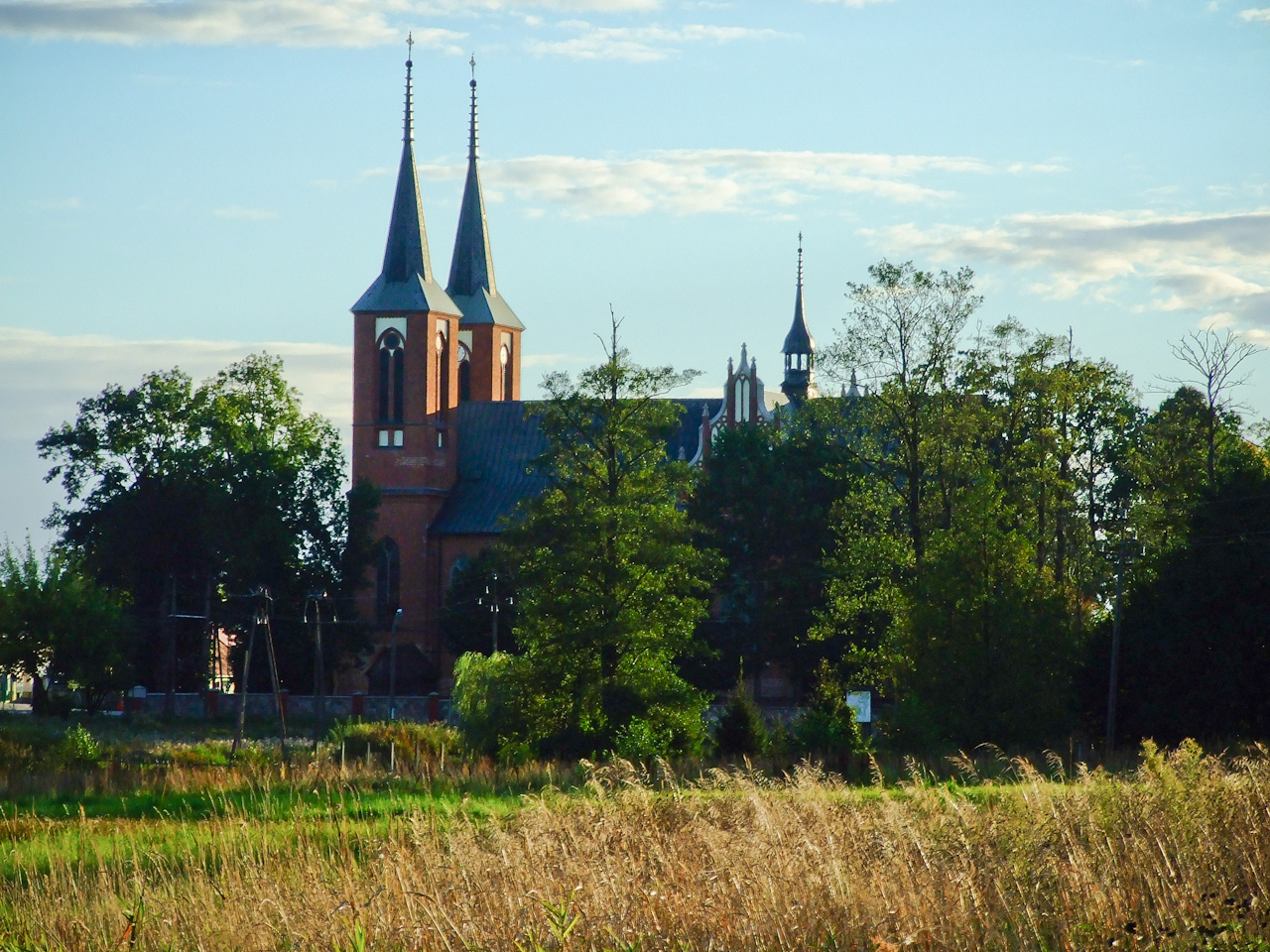
- Saint Roch Church

- Coat of arms

- Location within Poland
- Coordinates: 52°46′N 21°35′E
- Country: Poland
- Voivodeship: Masovian
- County: Wyszków
- Gmina: Długosiodło
- Population: 2,020
- Time zone: UTC+1 (CET)
  - Summer (DST): UTC+2 (CEST)
- Vehicle registration: WWY

Długosiodło [dwuɡɔˈɕɔdwɔ] is a village in Wyszków County, Masovian Voivodeship, in east-central Poland. It is the seat of the gmina (administrative district) called Gmina Długosiodło.

== History ==
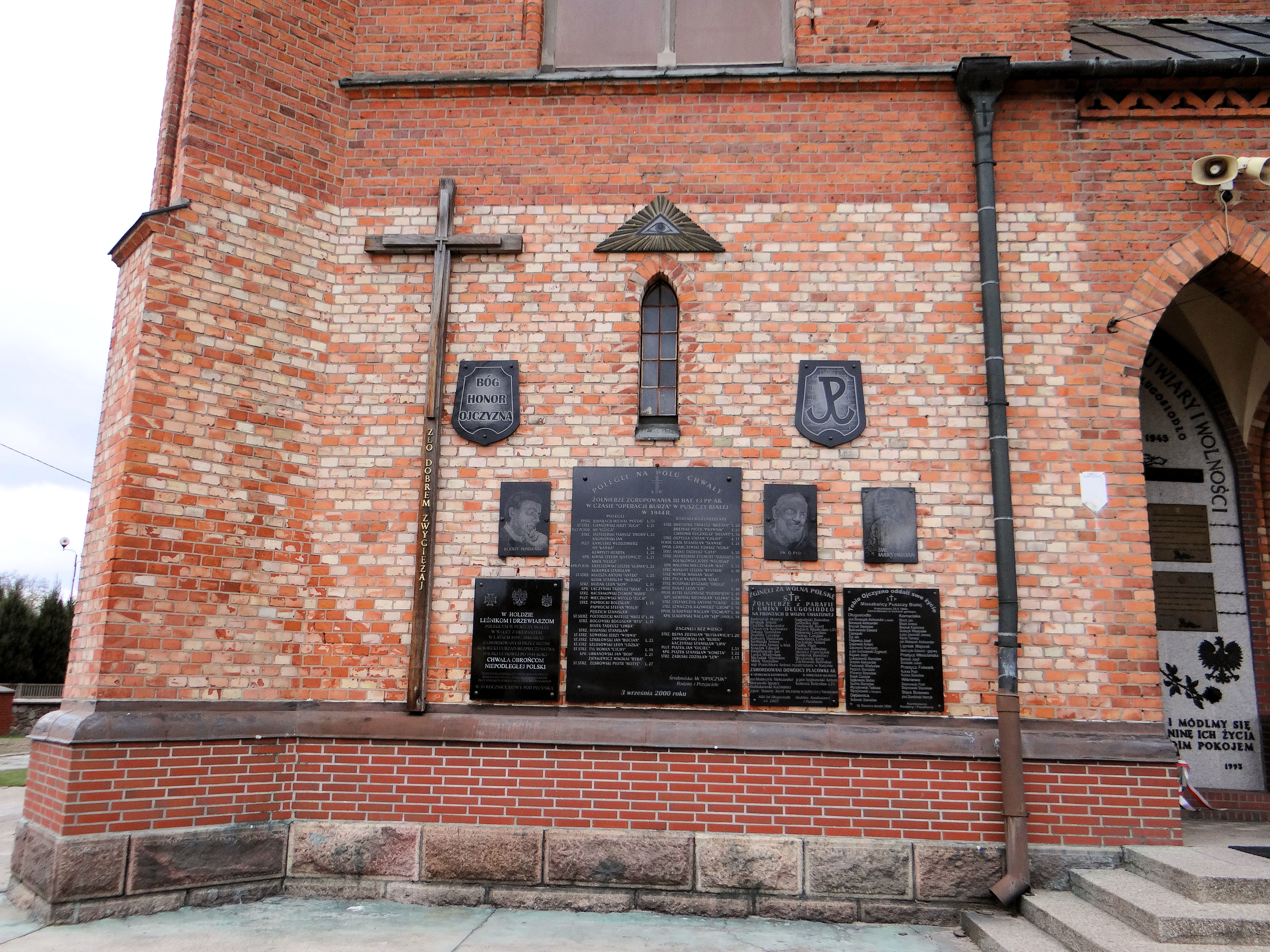
Memorial to the fallen and murdered members of the Polish resistance movement of World War II

The area formed part of Poland since the establishment of the state in the 10th century. Following Poland's fragmentation, it formed part of the Duchy of Masovia, a provincial duchy of Poland. On August 5, 1262, Długosiodło was the site of a battle between Masovian knights and the combined forces of Lithuania under chief Treniota and Ruthenians of Halych under prince Shvarno. Masovian knights lost the battle.

It was annexed by Prussia in the Third Partition of Poland in 1795. It was regained by Poles in 1807 and included within the short-lived Duchy of Warsaw, and after the duchy's dissolution in 1815, the village fell to the Russian Partition of Poland. Following World War I, Poland regained independence and control of the village. During the Polish–Soviet War, on 9 August 1920, it was the site of a battle between Poles and the invading Russians.

Following the joint German-Soviet invasion of Poland, which started World War II in September 1939, the village was occupied by Germany. In October 1939, the entire Jewish population was ordered to leave within an hour, abandoning their homes and taking only what they could carry. Various Polish underground resistance organizations were formed in the area by late 1939. The organizations were soon unified into a district of the Home Army under the cryptonym "Opocznik" ("wheatear") by Major Eugeniusz Mieszkowski nom de guerre Ostry. It covered the former Ostrów County, and was divided into five centers, one of which was located in Długosiodło.
