= Stasin, Wyszków County =

Stasin
- Village
- Location within Poland
- Coordinates: 52°44′21″N 21°31′06″E
- Country: Poland
- Voivodeship: Masovian
- County: Wyszków
- Gmina: Długosiodło
- Time zone: UTC+1 (CET)
  - Summer (DST): UTC+2 (CEST)

Stasin [ˈstaɕin] is a village in the administrative district of Gmina Długosiodło, within Wyszków County, Masovian Voivodeship, in east-central Poland.

Five Polish citizens were murdered by Nazi Germany in the village during World War II.
