= Gmina Zabrodzie =

Gmina Zabrodzie Zabrodzie Commune
- Gmina
- Flag Coat of arms

- Location within Poland
- Coordinates (Zabrodzie): 52°30′16″N 21°25′4″E
- Country: Poland
- Voivodeship: Masovian
- County: Wyszków
- Seat: Zabrodzie

Area
  - Total: 92.03 km^{2} (35.53 sq mi)

Population (2013)
  - Total: 5,847
  - Density: 63.53/km^{2} (164.6/sq mi)
- Website: https://www.zabrodzie.pl

Gmina Zabrodzie is a rural gmina (administrative district) in Wyszków County, Masovian Voivodeship, in east-central Poland. Its seat is the village of Zabrodzie, which lies approximately 10 kilometres (6 mi) south-west of Wyszków and 42 km (26 mi) north-east of Warsaw.

The gmina covers an area of 92.03 square kilometres (35.5 sq mi), and as of 2006 its total population is 5,535 (5,847 in 2013).

== Villages ==
Gmina Zabrodzie contains the villages and settlements of Adelin, Anastazew, Basinów, Choszczowe, Dębinki, Gaj, Głuchy, Karolinów, Kiciny, Lipiny, Młynarze, Mościska, Mostówka, Niegów, Obrąb, Płatków, Podgać, Przykory, Słopsk, Wysychy, Zabrodzie and Zazdrość.

== Neighbouring gminas ==
Gmina Zabrodzie is bordered by the gminas of Dąbrówka, Jadów, Tłuszcz and Wyszków.
