= Jarząbka =

- Village
- Location within Poland
- Coordinates: 52°48′30″N 21°42′10″E
- Country: Poland
- Voivodeship: Masovian
- County: Ostrów
- Gmina: Wąsewo
- Time zone: UTC+1 (CET)
  - Summer (DST): UTC+2 (CEST)
- Vehicle registration: WOR

Jarząbka [jaˈʐɔmpka] is a village in the administrative district of Gmina Wąsewo, within Ostrów County, Masovian Voivodeship, in east-central Poland.

== History ==
During the German occupation of Poland (World War II), on August 29, 1944, the village was the site of a battle between the underground Polish Home Army and German troops. It ended in a Polish victory. Four Poles were killed and two were wounded in the battle. In retaliation for the battle, the Germans committed pacifications of nearby villages of Małaszek, Plewki and Lipniak-Majorat, killing around 500 Poles.
