= Niegów =

- Village
- Location within Poland
- Coordinates: 52°31′N 21°23′E
- Country: Poland
- Voivodeship: Masovian
- County: Wyszków
- Gmina: Zabrodzie
- Population (2023): 700
- Postcode: 07-230
- Area Code: (+48) 29
- Vehicle registration: WWY

Niegów [ˈɲɛɡuf] is a village in the administrative district of Gmina Zabrodzie, within Wyszków County, Masovian Voivodeship, in east-central Poland.
