= Stasin, Gmina Konopnica =

Stasin
- Village
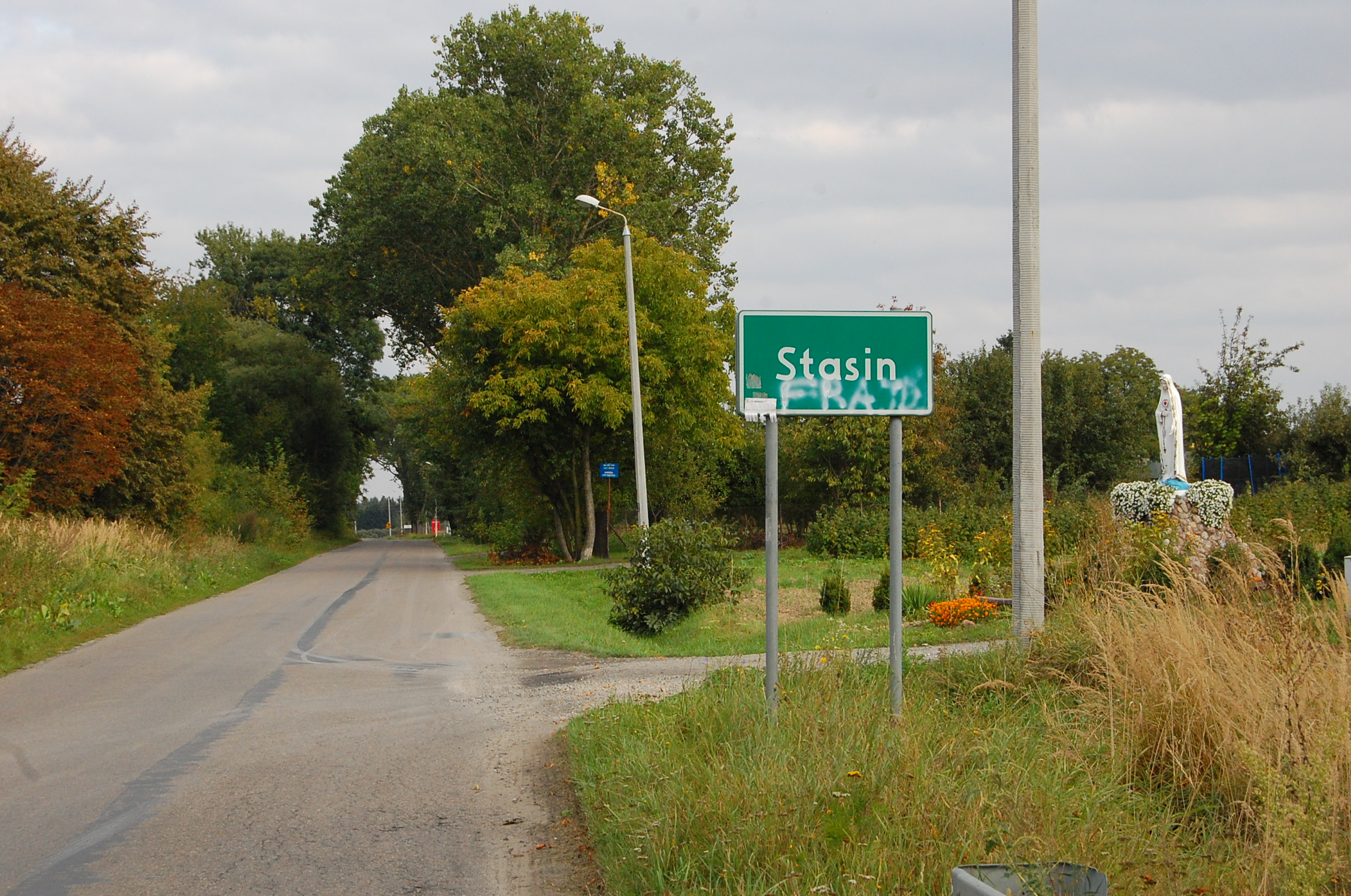
- Entrance to Stasin

- Location within Poland
- Coordinates: 51°12′46″N 22°28′44″E
- Country: Poland
- Voivodeship: Lublin
- County: Lublin
- Gmina: Konopnica

Stasin [ˈstaɕin] is a village in the administrative district of Gmina Konopnica, within Lublin County, Lublin Voivodeship, in eastern Poland.
