= Wyszków County =

Wyszków County Powiat wyszkowski
- County
- Flag Coat of arms

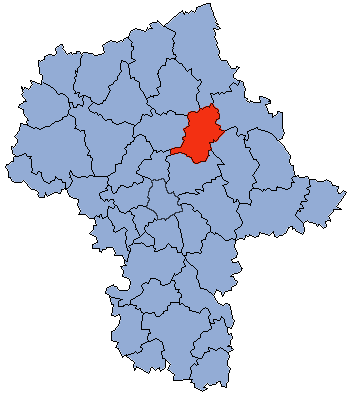
- Location within the voivodeship

- Division into gminas
- Coordinates (Wyszków): 52°35′36″N 21°27′36″E
- Country: Poland
- Voivodeship: Masovian
- Seat: Wyszków
- Gminas: Total 6: Gmina Brańszczyk; Gmina Długosiodło; Gmina Rząśnik; Gmina Somianka; Gmina Wyszków; Gmina Zabrodzie

Area
  - Total: 876.49 km^{2} (338.41 sq mi)

Population (2019)
  - Total: 74,094
  - Density: 84.535/km^{2} (218.94/sq mi)
  - Urban: 26,905
  - Rural: 47,189
- Car plates: WWY
- Website: www.powiat-wyszkowski.pl

Wyszków County (Polish: powiat wyszkowski) is a unit of territorial administration and local government (powiat) in Masovian Voivodeship, east-central Poland. It originally existed from 1956 until the abolition of the powiats in 1975, but was re-created on January 1, 1999, as a result of the Polish local government reforms passed in 1998, which reintroduced the powiats and created 16 large voivodeships. The administrative seat and only town in the county is Wyszków, which lies 53 kilometres (33 mi) north-east of Warsaw.

The county covers an area of 876.49 square kilometres (338.4 sq mi). As of 2019 its total population is 74,094, out of which the population of Wyszków is 26,905, and the rural population is 47,189.

== Neighbouring counties ==
Wyszków County is bordered by Ostrołęka County to the north, Ostrów County to the north-east, Węgrów County to the east, Wołomin County to the south, Legionowo County and Pułtusk County to the west, and Maków County to the north-west.

== Administrative divisions ==
The county is subdivided into six gminas (one urban-rural and five rural). These are listed in the following table, in descending order of population.

Gmina	Type	Area (km^{2})	Population (2019)	Seat
Gmina Wyszków	urban-rural	165.6	39,495	Wyszków
Gmina Brańszczyk	rural	167.6	8,266	Brańszczyk
Gmina Długosiodło	rural	167.5	7,795	Długosiodło
Gmina Rząśnik	rural	167.4	7,013	Rząśnik
Gmina Zabrodzie	rural	92.0	5,920	Zabrodzie
Gmina Somianka	rural	116.4	5,605	Somianka
