= Żochy, Ostrołęka County =

Żochy
- Village
- Location within Poland
- Coordinates: 52°58′15″N 21°49′36″E
- Country: Poland
- Voivodeship: Masovian
- County: Ostrołęka
- Gmina: Czerwin
- Population: 160

Żochy [ˈʐɔxɨ] is a village in the administrative district of Gmina Czerwin, within Ostrołęka County, Masovian Voivodeship, in east-central Poland.
