= Kruki, Ostrołęka County =

Kruki
- Village
- Location within Poland
- Coordinates: 53°5′27″N 21°31′7″E
- Country: Poland
- Voivodeship: Masovian
- County: Ostrołęka
- Gmina: Olszewo-Borki
- Population: 190

Kruki [ˈkruki] is a village in the administrative district of Gmina Olszewo-Borki, within Ostrołęka County, Masovian Voivodeship, in east-central Poland.
