= Obierwia =

- Village
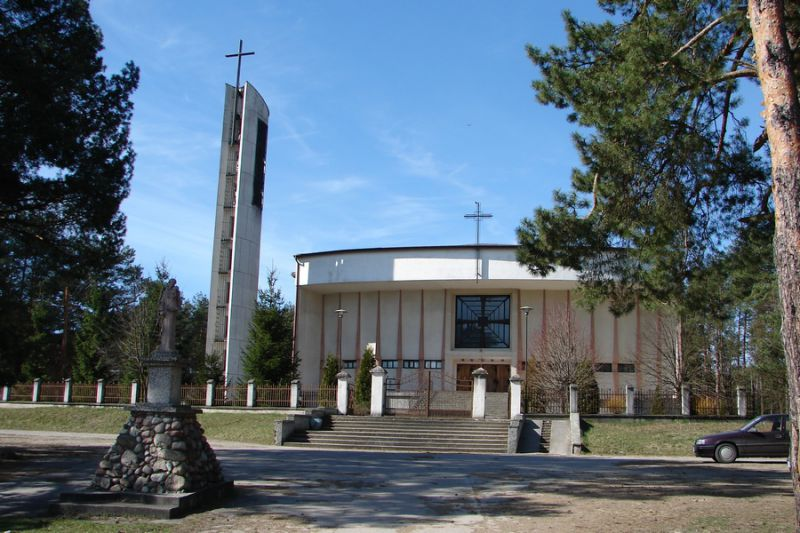
- Church of Our Lady of Częstochowa

- Location within Poland
- Coordinates: 53°9′32″N 21°26′44″E
- Country: Poland
- Voivodeship: Masovian
- County: Ostrołęka
- Gmina: Lelis

Obierwia [ɔˈbjɛrvja] is a village in the administrative district of Gmina Lelis, within Ostrołęka County, Masovian Voivodeship, in east-central Poland.
