= Gąski, Ostrołęka County =

Gąski
- Village
- Location within Poland
- Coordinates: 53°13′N 21°41′E
- Country: Poland
- Voivodeship: Masovian
- County: Ostrołęka
- Gmina: Lelis

Gąski [ˈɡɔ̃ski] is a village in the administrative district of Gmina Lelis, within Ostrołęka County, Masovian Voivodeship, in east-central Poland.
