= Grabowo, Gmina Olszewo-Borki =

Grabowo
- Village
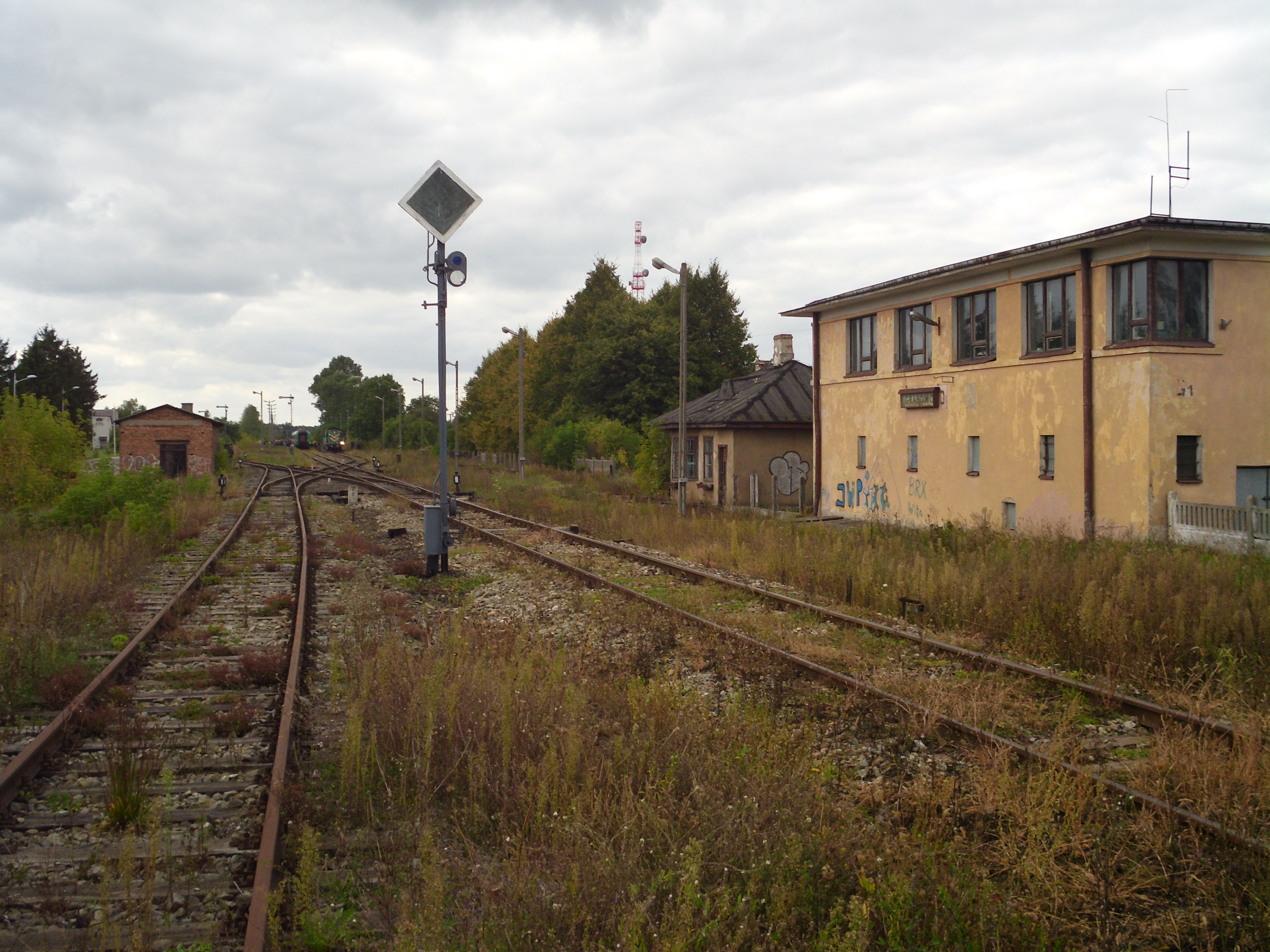
- Railway in Grabowo

- Location within Poland
- Coordinates: 53°03′32″N 21°31′00″E
- Country: Poland
- Voivodeship: Masovian
- County: Ostrołęka
- Gmina: Olszewo-Borki

Grabowo [ɡraˈbɔvɔ] is a village in the administrative district of Gmina Olszewo-Borki, within Ostrołęka County, Masovian Voivodeship, in east-central Poland.
