= Żerań Mały =

- Village
- Location within Poland
- Coordinates: 53°0′7″N 21°29′30″E
- Country: Poland
- Voivodeship: Masovian
- County: Ostrołęka
- Gmina: Olszewo-Borki
- Population: 102

Żerań Mały [ˈʐɛraɲ ˈmawɨ] is a village in the administrative district of Gmina Olszewo-Borki, within Ostrołęka County, Masovian Voivodeship, in east-central Poland.
