= Wiśniewo, Ostrołęka County =

Wiśniewo
- Village
- Location within Poland
- Coordinates: 52°58′N 21°51′E
- Country: Poland
- Voivodeship: Masovian
- County: Ostrołęka
- Gmina: Czerwin

Wiśniewo [viɕˈɲɛvɔ] is a village in the administrative district of Gmina Czerwin, within Ostrołęka County, Masovian Voivodeship, in east-central Poland.
