= Niedźwiedź, Masovian Voivodeship =

Niedźwiedź
- Village
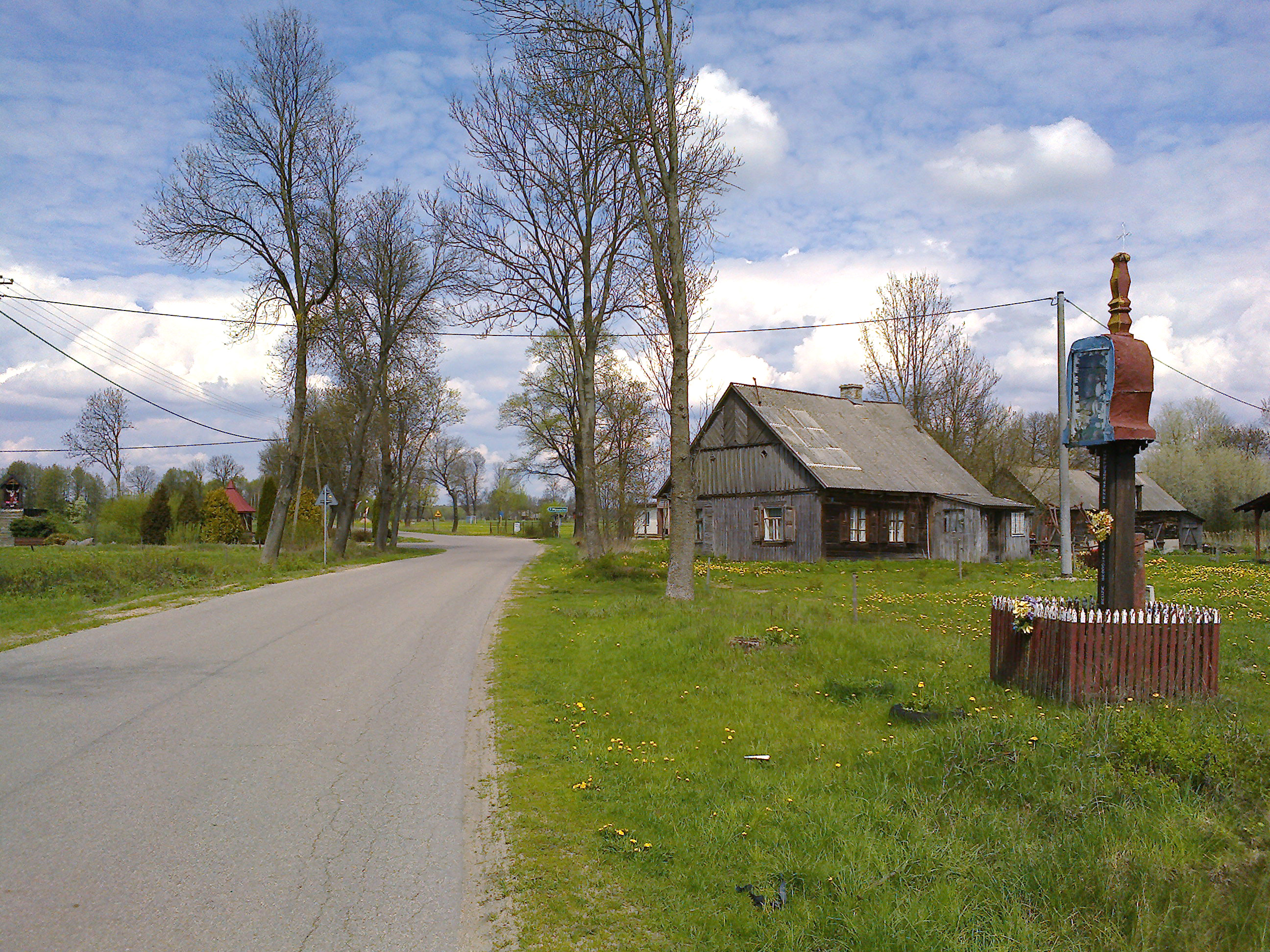

- Location within Poland
- Coordinates: 53°23′58″N 21°26′41″E
- Country: Poland
- Voivodeship: Masovian
- County: Ostrołęka
- Gmina: Myszyniec
- Time zone: UTC+1 (CET)
  - Summer (DST): UTC+2 (CEST)
- Postal code: 07-430
- Car plates: WOS

Niedźwiedź [ˈɲɛd͡ʑvjɛt͡ɕ] is a village in the administrative district of Gmina Myszyniec, within Ostrołęka County, Masovian Voivodeship, in east-central Poland.

Between 1975 and 1998, Niedźwiedź was located within the Ostrołęka Voivodeship
