= Andrzejki-Tyszki =

- Village
- Location within Poland
- Coordinates: 52°58′26″N 21°56′49″E
- Country: Poland
- Voivodeship: Masovian
- County: Ostrołęka
- Gmina: Czerwin
- Population (approx.): 120

Andrzejki-Tyszki [anˈdʐɛi̯ki ˈtɨʂki] is a village in the administrative district of Gmina Czerwin, within Ostrołęka County, Masovian Voivodeship, in east-central Poland.
