= Seroczyn =

Seroczyn may refer to the following places:

- Seroczyn, Ostrołęka County in Masovian Voivodeship (east-central Poland)
- Seroczyn, Siedlce County in Masovian Voivodeship (east-central Poland)
- Seroczyn, Sokołów County in Masovian Voivodeship (east-central Poland)
