= Drwęcz =

- Village
- Location within Poland
- Coordinates: 53°2′2″N 21°39′52″E
- Country: Poland
- Voivodeship: Masovian
- County: Ostrołęka
- Gmina: Rzekuń

Drwęcz [drvɛnt͡ʂ] is a village in the administrative district of Gmina Rzekuń, within Ostrołęka County, Masovian Voivodeship, in east-central Poland.
