= Dąbrówka, Ostrołęka County =

Dąbrówka
- Village
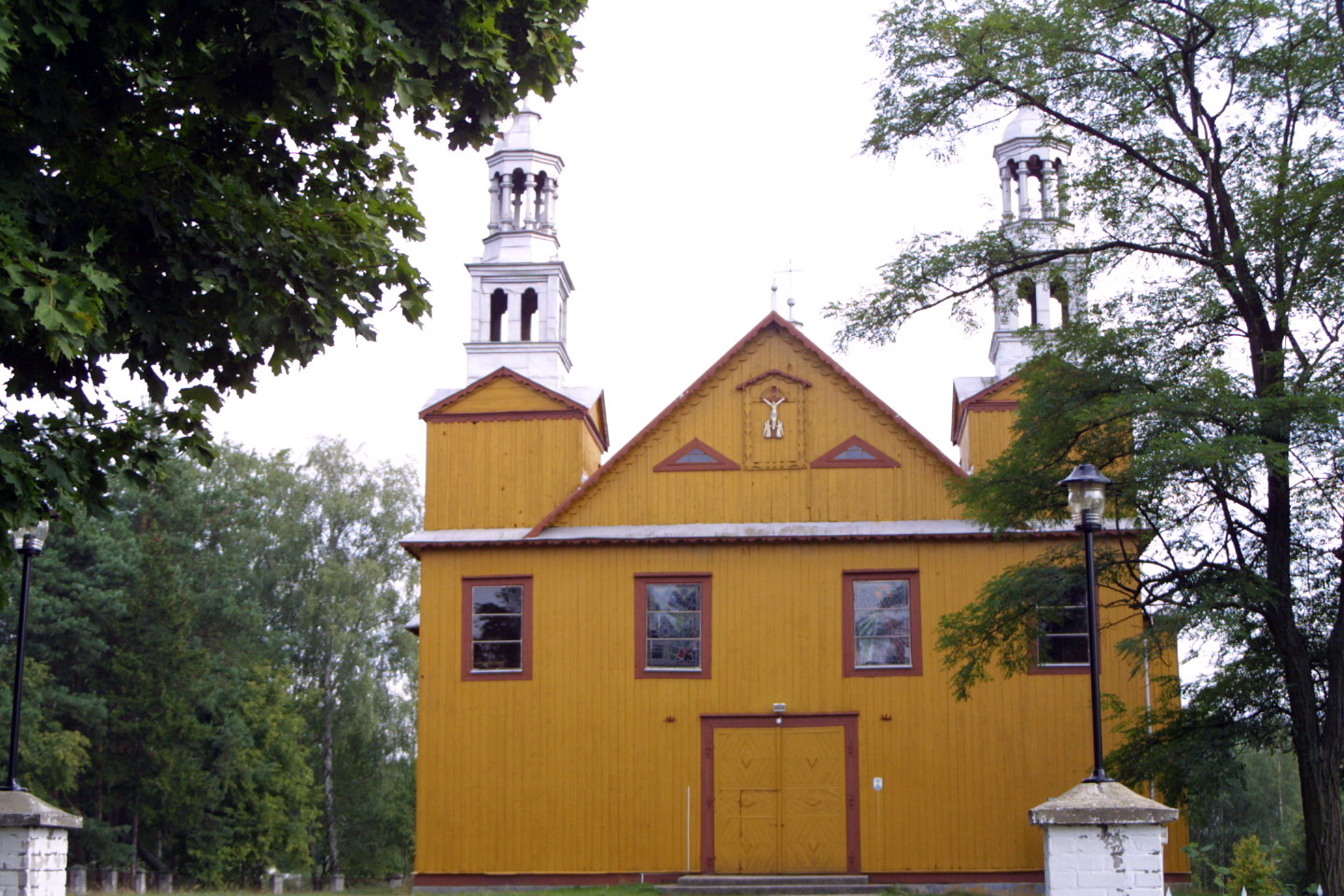
- Saint Anne church in Dąbrówka

- Location within Poland
- Coordinates: 53°12′40″N 21°39′4″E
- Country: Poland
- Voivodeship: Masovian
- County: Ostrołęka
- Gmina: Lelis
- Population: 410

Dąbrówka [dɔmˈbrufka] is a village in the administrative district of Gmina Lelis, within Ostrołęka County, Masovian Voivodeship, in east-central Poland.
