= Białusny Lasek =

- Village
- Location within Poland
- Coordinates: 53°22′N 21°19′E
- Country: Poland
- Voivodeship: Masovian
- County: Ostrołęka
- Gmina: Myszyniec
- Population: 347

Białusny Lasek [bjaˈwusnɨ ˈlasɛk] is a village in the administrative district of Gmina Myszyniec, within Ostrołęka County, Masovian Voivodeship, in east-central Poland.
