= Dzwonek, Masovian Voivodeship =

Dzwonek
- Village
- Location within Poland
- Coordinates: 52°57′39″N 21°42′31″E
- Country: Poland
- Voivodeship: Masovian
- County: Ostrołęka
- Gmina: Czerwin
- Population (approx.): 320

Dzwonek [ˈd͡zvɔnɛk] is a village in the administrative district of Gmina Czerwin, within Ostrołęka County, Masovian Voivodeship, in east-central Poland.
