= Surowe, Masovian Voivodeship =

Surowe
- Village
- Location within Poland
- Coordinates: 53°19′27″N 21°08′20″E
- Country: Poland
- Voivodeship: Masovian
- County: Ostrołęka
- Gmina: Czarnia

Surowe [suˈrɔvɛ] is a village in the administrative district of Gmina Czarnia, within Ostrołęka County, Masovian Voivodeship, in east-central Poland.
