= Łęg Starościński =

- Village
- Location within Poland
- Coordinates: 53°8′11″N 21°38′30″E
- Country: Poland
- Voivodeship: Masovian
- County: Ostrołęka
- Gmina: Lelis

Łęg Starościński [ˈwɛnk starɔɕˈt͡ɕiɲski] is a village in the administrative district of Gmina Lelis, within Ostrołęka County, Masovian Voivodeship, in east-central Poland.
