= Zaorze, Gmina Czerwin =

Zaorze
- Village
- Location within Poland
- Coordinates: 52°57′18″N 21°46′4″E
- Country: Poland
- Voivodeship: Masovian
- County: Ostrołęka
- Gmina: Czerwin
- Highest elevation: 150 m (490 ft)
- Lowest elevation: 100 m (330 ft)

Zaorze [zaˈɔʐɛ] is a village in the administrative district of Gmina Czerwin, within Ostrołęka County, Masovian Voivodeship, in east-central Poland.
