= Brzozowy Kąt, Masovian Voivodeship =

Brzozowy Kąt
- Village
- Location within Poland
- Coordinates: 53°22′N 21°14′E
- Country: Poland
- Voivodeship: Masovian
- County: Ostrołęka
- Gmina: Czarnia

Brzozowy Kąt [bʐɔˈzɔvɨ ˈkɔnt] is a village in the administrative district of Gmina Czarnia, within Ostrołęka County, Masovian Voivodeship, in east-central Poland.
