= Gumki =

- Village
- Location within Poland
- Coordinates: 52°57′20″N 21°47′43″E
- Country: Poland
- Voivodeship: Masovian
- County: Ostrołęka
- Gmina: Czerwin

Gumki [ˈɡumki] is a village in the administrative district of Gmina Czerwin, within Ostrołęka County, Masovian Voivodeship, in east-central Poland.
