= Teodorowo, Ostrołęka County =

Teodorowo
- Village
- Location within Poland
- Coordinates: 53°6′53″N 21°38′30″E
- Country: Poland
- Voivodeship: Masovian
- County: Ostrołęka
- Gmina: Rzekuń

Teodorowo [tɛɔdɔˈrɔvɔ] is a village in the administrative district of Gmina Rzekuń, within Ostrołęka County, Masovian Voivodeship, in east-central Poland.
