= Żebry-Chudek =

- Village
- Location within Poland
- Coordinates: 53°4′N 21°26′E
- Country: Poland
- Voivodeship: Masovian
- County: Ostrołęka
- Gmina: Olszewo-Borki

Żebry-Chudek [ˈʐɛbrɨ ˈxudɛk] is a village in the administrative district of Gmina Olszewo-Borki, within Ostrołęka County, Masovian Voivodeship, in east-central Poland.
