= Wiśniówek, Ostrołęka County =

Wiśniówek
- Village
- Location within Poland
- Coordinates: 52°57′11″N 21°50′16″E
- Country: Poland
- Voivodeship: Masovian
- County: Ostrołęka
- Gmina: Czerwin

Wiśniówek [viɕˈɲuvɛk] is a village in the administrative district of Gmina Czerwin, within Ostrołęka County, Masovian Voivodeship, in east-central Poland.
