= Gibałka =

- Village
- Location within Poland
- Coordinates: 53°10′59″N 21°30′22″E
- Country: Poland
- Voivodeship: Masovian
- County: Ostrołęka
- Gmina: Lelis

Gibałka [ɡiˈbau̯ka] is a village in the administrative district of Gmina Lelis, within Ostrołęka County, Masovian Voivodeship, in east-central Poland.
