= Łazy, Ostrołęka County =

Łazy
- Village
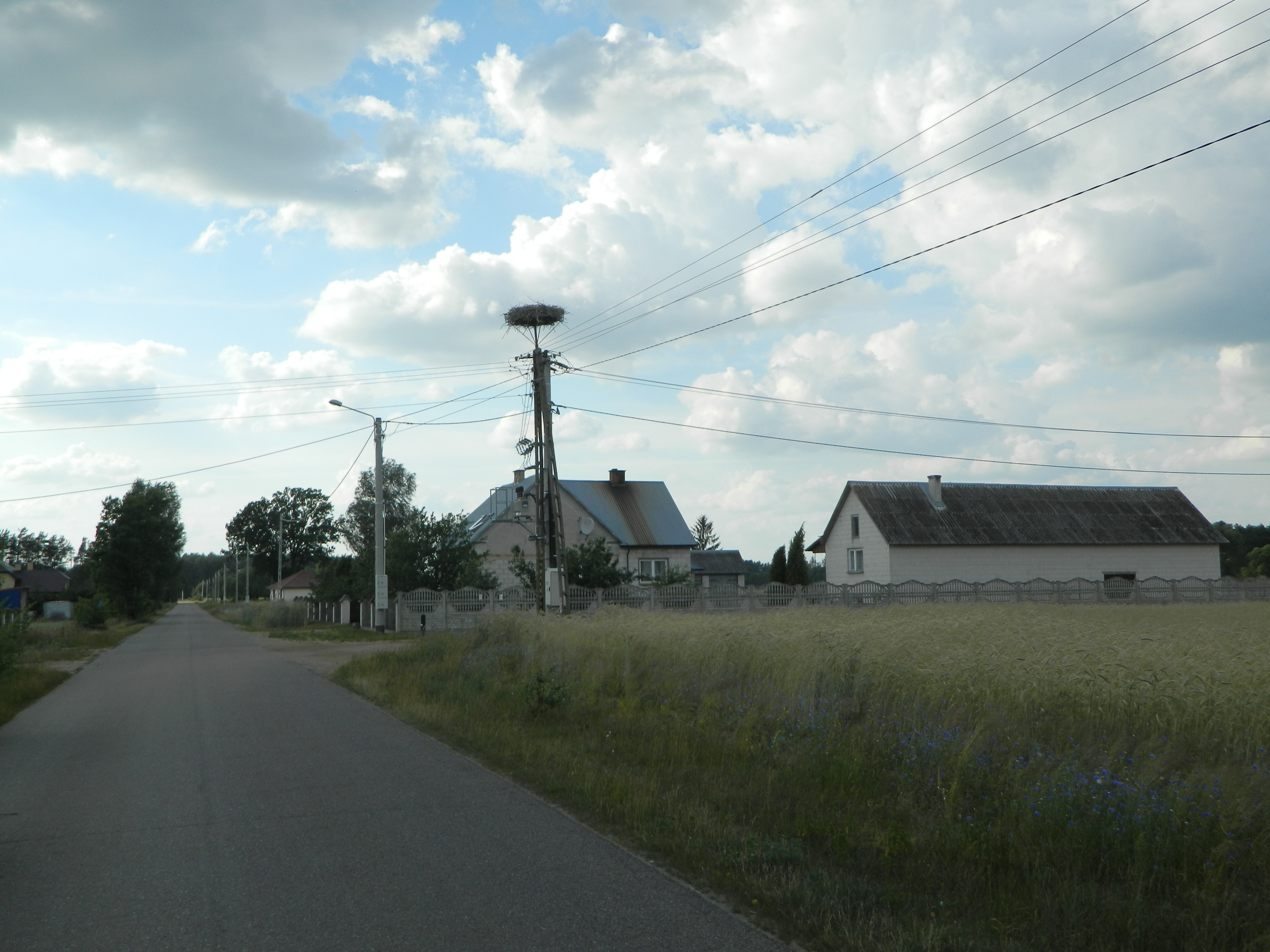

- Location within Poland
- Coordinates: 53°7′N 21°30′E
- Country: Poland
- Voivodeship: Masovian
- County: Ostrołęka
- Gmina: Olszewo-Borki
- Time zone: UTC+1 (CET)
  - Summer (DST): UTC+2 (CEST)

Łazy [ˈwazɨ] is a village in the administrative district of Gmina Olszewo-Borki, within Ostrołęka County, Masovian Voivodeship, in east-central Poland.

Three Polish citizens were murdered by Nazi Germany in the village during World War II.
