= Pełty, Masovian Voivodeship =

Pełty
- Village
- Location within Poland
- Coordinates: 53°24′25″N 21°14′15″E
- Country: Poland
- Voivodeship: Masovian
- County: Ostrołęka
- Gmina: Myszyniec

Pełty [ˈpɛu̯tɨ] is a village in the administrative district of Gmina Myszyniec, within Ostrołęka County, Masovian Voivodeship, in east-central Poland.

== See also ==
- Barney Pelty (1880-1939), American Major League Baseball player
