= Rozwory, Masovian Voivodeship =

Rozwory
- Village
- Location within Poland
- Coordinates: 53°5′36″N 21°44′19″E
- Country: Poland
- Voivodeship: Masovian
- County: Ostrołęka
- Gmina: Rzekuń

Rozwory [rɔzˈvɔrɨ] is a village in the administrative district of Gmina Rzekuń, within Ostrołęka County, Masovian Voivodeship, in east-central Poland.
