= Szkwa, Masovian Voivodeship =

Szkwa
- Village
- Location within Poland
- Coordinates: 53°11′28″N 21°40′34″E
- Country: Poland
- Voivodeship: Masovian
- County: Ostrołęka
- Gmina: Lelis

Szkwa [ʂkfa] is a village in the administrative district of Gmina Lelis, within Ostrołęka County, Masovian Voivodeship, in east-central Poland.
