= Sokołowo, Ostrołęka County =

Sokołowo
- Village
- Location within Poland
- Coordinates: 52°56′59″N 21°49′13″E
- Country: Poland
- Voivodeship: Masovian
- County: Ostrołęka
- Gmina: Czerwin

Sokołowo [sɔkɔˈwɔvɔ] is a village in the administrative district of Gmina Czerwin, within Ostrołęka County, Masovian Voivodeship, in east-central Poland.
