= Szafarnia, Masovian Voivodeship =

Szafarnia
- Village
- Location within Poland
- Coordinates: 53°10′59″N 21°28′53″E
- Country: Poland
- Voivodeship: Masovian
- County: Ostrołęka
- Gmina: Lelis

Szafarnia [ʂaˈfarɲa] is a village in the administrative district of Gmina Lelis, within Ostrołęka County, Masovian Voivodeship, in east-central Poland. In 1975–98 Szafarnia was part of Ostrołęka Voivodeship.

Szafarnia is one of three villages of that name in Poland (the other two being in Kuyavian-Pomeranian Voivodeship and Warmian-Masurian Voivodeship).
