= Stepna-Michałki =

Village in Gmina Olszewo-Borki, Poland

- Village
- Location within Poland
- Coordinates: 53°02′28″N 21°28′36″E
- Country: Poland
- Voivodeship: Masovian
- County: Ostrołęka
- Gmina: Olszewo-Borki

Stepna-Michałki [ˈstɛpna miˈxau̯ki] is a village in the administrative district of Gmina Olszewo-Borki, within Ostrołęka County, Masovian Voivodeship, in east-central Poland.
