= Korczaki =

- Village
- Location within Poland
- Coordinates: 53°2′1″N 21°32′34″E
- Country: Poland
- Voivodeship: Masovian
- County: Ostrołęka
- Gmina: Rzekuń

Korczaki [kɔrˈt͡ʂaki] is a village in the administrative district of Gmina Rzekuń, within Ostrołęka County, Masovian Voivodeship, in east-central Poland.
