= Cięćk =

- Village
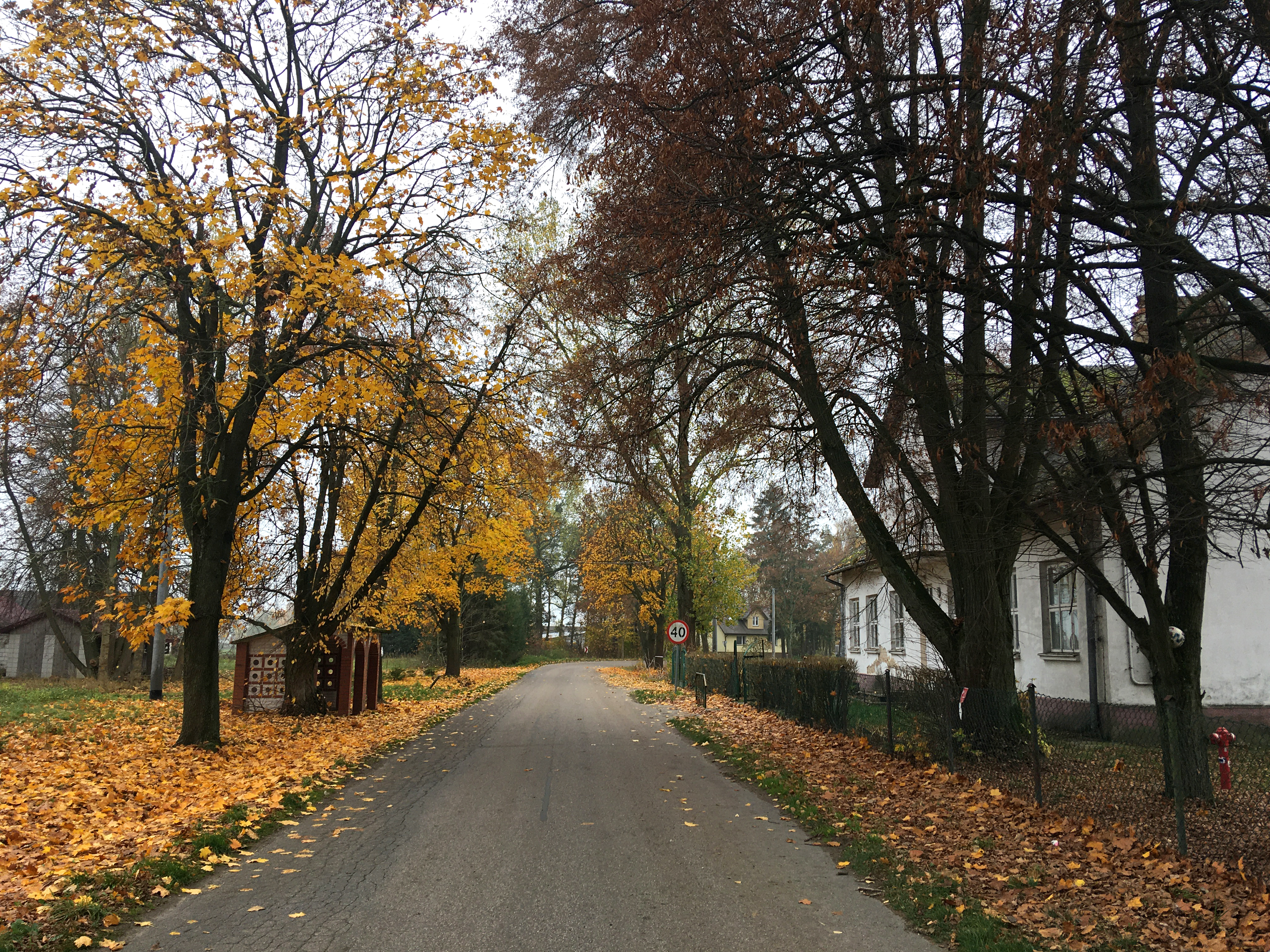

- Location within Poland
- Coordinates: 53°23′6″N 21°28′24″E
- Country: Poland
- Voivodeship: Masovian
- County: Ostrołęka
- Gmina: Myszyniec
- Time zone: UTC+1 (CET)
  - Summer (DST): UTC+2 (CEST)
- Vehicle registration: WOS

Cięćk [t͡ɕɛnt͡ɕk] is a village in the administrative district of Gmina Myszyniec, within Ostrołęka County, Masovian Voivodeship, in east-central Poland.
