= Bandysie =

- Village
- Location within Poland
- Coordinates: 53°19′N 21°13′E
- Country: Poland
- Voivodeship: Masovian
- County: Ostrołęka
- Gmina: Czarnia
- Population: 430

Bandysie [banˈdɨɕɛ] is a village in the administrative district of Gmina Czarnia, within Ostrołęka County, Masovian Voivodeship, in east-central Poland.
