= Gocły =

- Village
- Location within Poland
- Coordinates: 52°55′27″N 21°43′32″E
- Country: Poland
- Voivodeship: Masovian
- County: Ostrołęka
- Gmina: Czerwin

Gocły [ˈɡɔt͡swɨ] is a village in the administrative district of Gmina Czerwin, within Ostrołęka County, Masovian Voivodeship, in east-central Poland.
