= Tyszki-Ciągaczki =

- Village
- Location within Poland
- Coordinates: 52°58′36″N 21°53′11″E
- Country: Poland
- Voivodeship: Masovian
- County: Ostrołęka
- Gmina: Czerwin
- Population: 33

Tyszki-Ciągaczki [ˈtɨʂki t͡ɕɔŋˈɡat͡ʂki] is a village in the administrative district of Gmina Czerwin, within Ostrołęka County, Masovian Voivodeship, in east-central Poland.
