= Wólka Czerwińska =

- Village
- Location within Poland
- Coordinates: 52°58′39″N 21°48′11″E
- Country: Poland
- Voivodeship: Masovian
- County: Ostrołęka
- Gmina: Czerwin
- Population (approx.): 50

Wólka Czerwińska [ˈvulka t͡ʂɛrˈviɲska] is a village in the administrative district of Gmina Czerwin, within Ostrołęka County, Masovian Voivodeship, in east-central Poland.
