= Laski Włościańskie =

- Village
- Location within Poland
- Coordinates: 52°56′02″N 21°47′16″E
- Country: Poland
- Voivodeship: Masovian
- County: Ostrołęka
- Gmina: Czerwin

Laski Włościańskie (Polish pronunciation: [ˈlaskʲi vwɔɕˈtɕaj̃skʲɛ]) is a village in the administrative district of Gmina Czerwin, within Ostrołęka County, Masovian Voivodeship, in east-central Poland.
