= Tobolice, Masovian Voivodeship =

Tobolice
- Village
- Location within Poland
- Coordinates: 53°2′49″N 21°35′17″E
- Country: Poland
- Voivodeship: Masovian
- County: Ostrołęka
- Gmina: Rzekuń
- Population (approx.): 400

Tobolice [tɔbɔˈlit͡sɛ] is a village in the administrative district of Gmina Rzekuń, within Ostrołęka County, Masovian Voivodeship, in east-central Poland.
