= Borek, Ostrołęka County =

Borek
- Village
- Location within Poland
- Coordinates: 52°56′29″N 21°43′6″E
- Country: Poland
- Voivodeship: Masovian
- County: Ostrołęka
- Gmina: Czerwin

Borek [ˈbɔrɛk] is a village in the administrative district of Gmina Czerwin, within Ostrołęka County, Masovian Voivodeship, in east-central Poland.
