= Daniszewo =

Daniszewo may refer to the following places in Poland:

- Daniszewo, Płock County
- Daniszewo, Ostrołęka County
