= Żebry-Ostrowy =

- Village
- Location within Poland
- Coordinates: 53°3′57″N 21°25′59″E
- Country: Poland
- Voivodeship: Masovian
- County: Ostrołęka
- Gmina: Olszewo-Borki

Żebry-Ostrowy [ˈʐɛbrɨ ɔsˈtrɔvɨ] is a village in the administrative district of Gmina Olszewo-Borki, within Ostrołęka County, Masovian Voivodeship, in east-central Poland.
