= Chojniki, Masovian Voivodeship =

Chojniki
- Village
- Location within Poland
- Coordinates: 53°7′5″N 21°22′41″E
- Country: Poland
- Voivodeship: Masovian
- County: Ostrołęka
- Gmina: Olszewo-Borki
- Population: 210
- Website: http://www.chojniki.bo.pl

Chojniki [xɔi̯ˈniki] is a village in the administrative district of Gmina Olszewo-Borki, within Ostrołęka County, Masovian Voivodeship, in east-central Poland.
