= Siemnocha =

- Village
- Location within Poland
- Coordinates: 53°8′N 21°33′E
- Country: Poland
- Voivodeship: Masovian
- County: Ostrołęka
- Gmina: Lelis

Siemnocha [ɕɛmˈnɔxa] is a village in the administrative district of Gmina Lelis, within Ostrołęka County, Masovian Voivodeship, in east-central Poland.
