= Żebry-Perosy =

- Village
- Location within Poland
- Coordinates: 53°0′N 21°27′E
- Country: Poland
- Voivodeship: Masovian
- County: Ostrołęka
- Gmina: Olszewo-Borki
- Time zone: UTC+1 (CET)
  - Summer (DST): UTC+2 (CEST)

Żebry-Perosy [ˈʐɛbrɨ pɛˈrɔsɨ] is a village in the administrative district of Gmina Olszewo-Borki, within Ostrołęka County, Masovian Voivodeship, in east-central Poland.

One Polish citizen was murdered by Nazi Germany in the village during World War II.
