= Stare Dobki =

- Village
- Location within Poland
- Coordinates: 52°58′3″N 21°48′39″E
- Country: Poland
- Voivodeship: Masovian
- County: Ostrołęka
- Gmina: Czerwin
- Population: 70

Stare Dobki [ˈstarɛ ˈdɔpki] is a village in the administrative district of Gmina Czerwin, within Ostrołęka County, Masovian Voivodeship, in east-central Poland.
