= Skarżyn, Ostrołęka County =

Skarżyn
- Village
- Location within Poland
- Coordinates: 52°55′26″N 21°42′25″E
- Country: Poland
- Voivodeship: Masovian
- County: Ostrołęka
- Gmina: Czerwin

Skarżyn [ˈskarʐɨn] is a village in the administrative district of Gmina Czerwin, within Ostrołęka County, Masovian Voivodeship, in east-central Poland.
