= Nowa Wieś Wschodnia =

- Village
- Location within Poland
- Coordinates: 53°05′19″N 21°40′12″E
- Country: Poland
- Voivodeship: Masovian
- County: Ostrołęka
- Gmina: Rzekuń

Nowa Wieś Wschodnia [ˈnɔva ˈvjɛɕ ˈfsxɔdɲa] is a village in the administrative district of Gmina Rzekuń, within Ostrołęka County, Masovian Voivodeship, in east-central Poland.
