= Cupel, Ostrołęka County =

Cupel
- Village
- Location within Poland
- Coordinates: 53°20′45″N 21°06′43″E
- Country: Poland
- Voivodeship: Masovian
- County: Ostrołęka
- Gmina: Czarnia

Cupel [ˈt͡supɛl] is a village in the administrative district of Gmina Czarnia, within Ostrołęka County, Masovian Voivodeship, in east-central Poland.
