= Rutkowo, Masovian Voivodeship =

Rutkowo
- Village
- Location within Poland
- Coordinates: 53°21′45″N 21°10′27″E
- Country: Poland
- Voivodeship: Masovian
- County: Ostrołęka
- Gmina: Czarnia

Rutkowo [rutˈkɔvɔ] is a village in the administrative district of Gmina Czarnia, within Ostrołęka County, Masovian Voivodeship, in east-central Poland.
