= Antonie, Masovian Voivodeship =

Antonie
- Village
- Location within Poland
- Coordinates: 53°8′N 21°32′E
- Country: Poland
- Voivodeship: Masovian
- County: Ostrołęka
- Gmina: Olszewo-Borki

Antonie [anˈtɔɲɛ] is a village in the administrative district of Gmina Olszewo-Borki, within Ostrołęka County, Masovian Voivodeship, in east-central Poland.
