= Żebry-Sławki =

- Village
- Location within Poland
- Coordinates: 53°1′N 21°24′E
- Country: Poland
- Voivodeship: Masovian
- County: Ostrołęka
- Gmina: Olszewo-Borki

Żebry-Sławki [ˈʐɛbrɨ ˈswafki] is a village in the administrative district of Gmina Olszewo-Borki, within Ostrołęka County, Masovian Voivodeship, in east-central Poland.
