= Grabnik, Ostrołęka County =

Grabnik
- Village
- Location within Poland
- Coordinates: 53°6′N 21°24′E
- Country: Poland
- Voivodeship: Masovian
- County: Ostrołęka
- Gmina: Olszewo-Borki

Grabnik [ˈɡrabnik] is a village in the administrative district of Gmina Olszewo-Borki, within Ostrołęka County, Masovian Voivodeship, in east-central Poland.
