= Długie, Ostrołęka County =

Długie
- Village
- Location within Poland
- Coordinates: 53°18′04″N 21°10′54″E
- Country: Poland
- Voivodeship: Masovian
- County: Ostrołęka
- Gmina: Czarnia

Długie [ˈdwuɡʲɛ] is a village in the administrative district of Gmina Czarnia, within Ostrołęka County, Masovian Voivodeship, in east-central Poland.
