= Wolkowe =

- Village
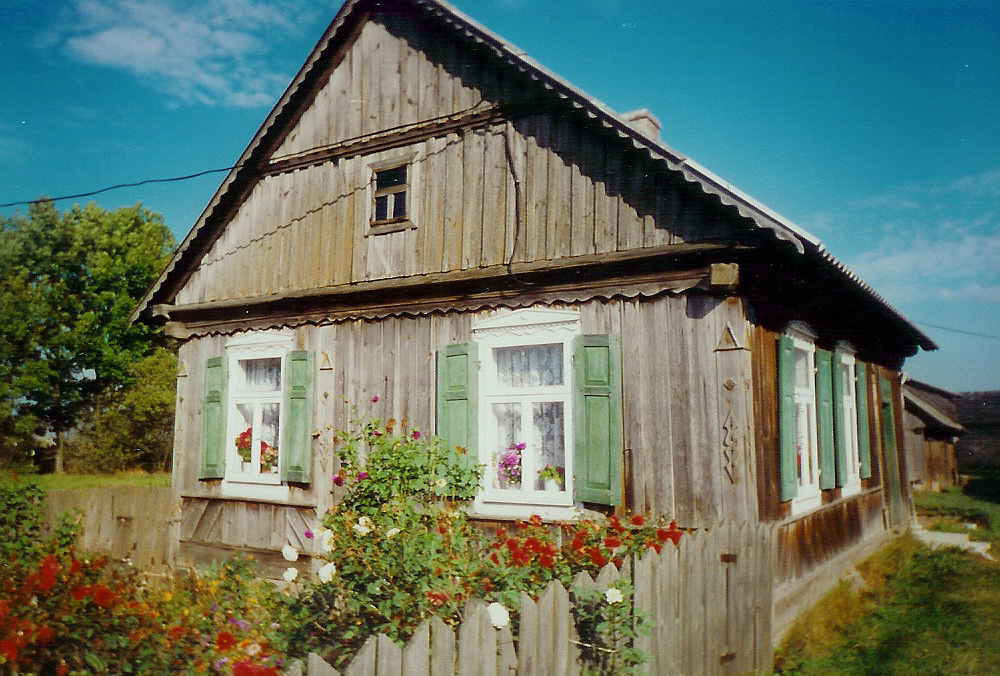

- Location within Poland
- Coordinates: 53°24′58″N 21°23′21″E
- Country: Poland
- Voivodeship: Masovian
- County: Ostrołęka
- Gmina: Myszyniec
- Population: 1,000

Wolkowe [vɔlˈkɔvɛ] is a village in the administrative district of Gmina Myszyniec, within Ostrołęka County, Masovian Voivodeship, in east-central Poland. Wolkowe follows the Europe/Warsaw time zone.
