= Nowe Dobki =

- Village
- Location within Poland
- Coordinates: 52°58′52″N 21°48′42″E
- Country: Poland
- Voivodeship: Masovian
- County: Ostrołęka
- Gmina: Czerwin
- Population: 28

Nowe Dobki [ˈnɔvɛ ˈdɔpki] is a village in the administrative district of Gmina Czerwin, within Ostrołęka County, Masovian Voivodeship, in east-central Poland. As of 2011, it had a population of 28.
