= Borawe =

- Village
- Location within Poland
- Coordinates: 52°59′N 21°36′E
- Country: Poland
- Voivodeship: Masovian
- County: Ostrołęka
- Gmina: Rzekuń
- Time zone: UTC+1 (CET)
  - Summer (DST): UTC+2 (CEST)

Borawe [bɔˈravɛ] is a village in the administrative district of Gmina Rzekuń, within Ostrołęka County, Masovian Voivodeship, in east-central Poland.

Six Polish citizens were murdered by Nazi Germany in the village during World War II.
