= Cyk, Masovian Voivodeship =

Cyk
- Village
- Location within Poland
- Coordinates: 53°22′51″N 21°12′04″E
- Country: Poland
- Voivodeship: Masovian
- County: Ostrołęka
- Gmina: Czarnia
- Population: 250

Cyk [t͡sɨk] is a village in the administrative district of Gmina Czarnia, within Ostrołęka County, Masovian Voivodeship, in east-central Poland.
