= Kurpiewskie =

- Village
- Location within Poland
- Coordinates: 53°10′16″N 21°41′28″E
- Country: Poland
- Voivodeship: Masovian
- County: Ostrołęka
- Gmina: Lelis

|

Kurpiewskie [kurˈpjɛfskʲɛ] is a village in the administrative district of Gmina Lelis, within Ostrołęka County, Masovian Voivodeship, in east-central Poland.
