= Zdunek =

- Village
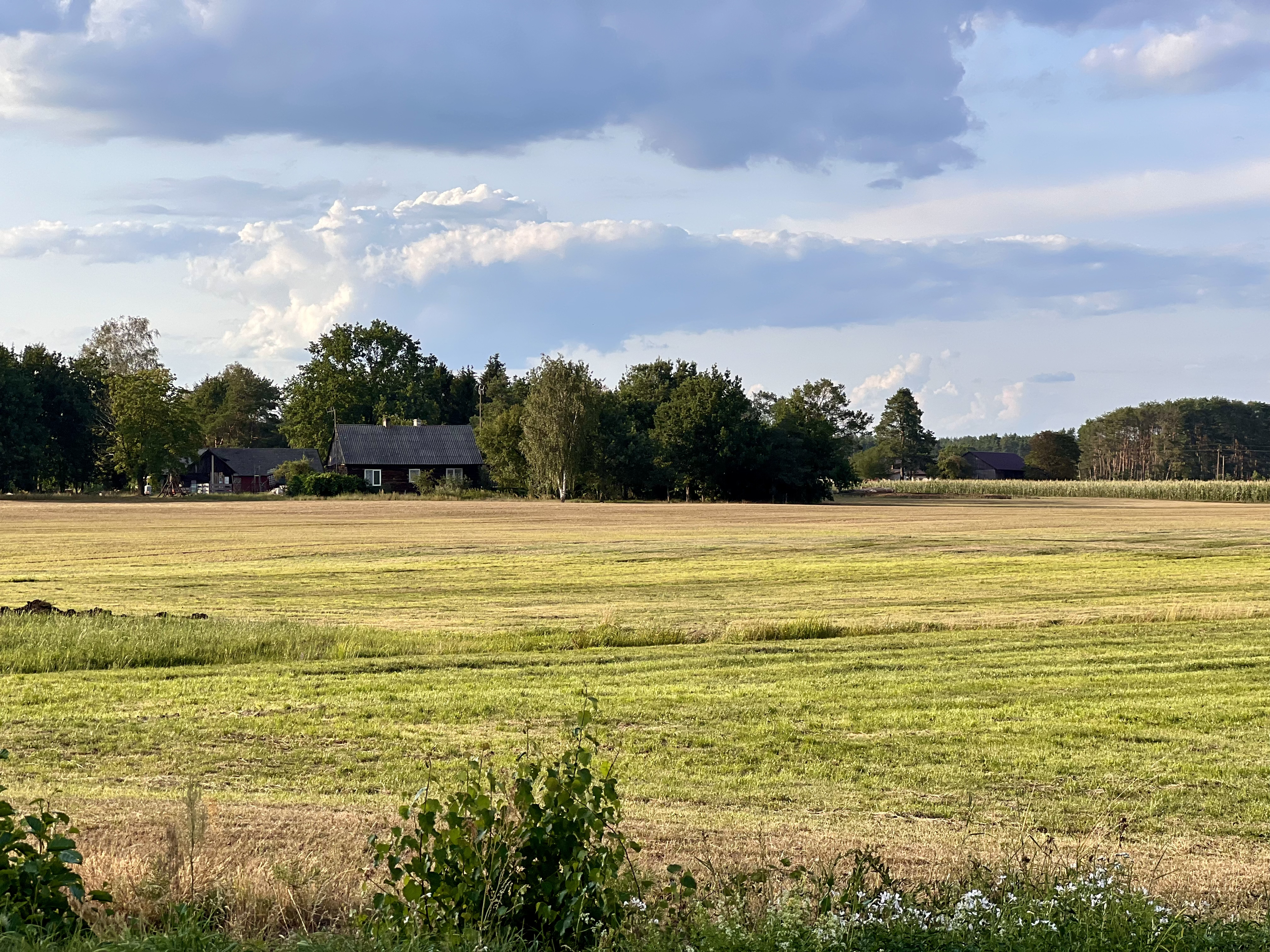

- Location within Poland
- Coordinates: 53°20′12″N 21°19′27″E
- Country: Poland
- Voivodeship: Masovian
- County: Ostrołęka
- Gmina: Myszyniec
- Time zone: UTC+1 (CET)
  - Summer (DST): UTC+2 (CEST)
- Vehicle registration: WOS

Zdunek [ˈzdunɛk] is a village in the administrative district of Gmina Myszyniec, within Ostrołęka County, Masovian Voivodeship, in east-central Poland.
