= Bobin, Masovian Voivodeship =

Bobin
- Village
- Location within Poland
- Coordinates: 52°57′32″N 21°38′5″E
- Country: Poland
- Voivodeship: Masovian
- County: Ostrołęka
- Gmina: Czerwin
- Population: 70

Bobin [ˈbɔbin] is a village in the administrative district of Gmina Czerwin, within Ostrołęka County, Masovian Voivodeship, in east-central Poland.
