= Białobrzeg Bliższy =

- Village
- Location within Poland
- Coordinates: 53°6′26″N 21°28′51″E
- Country: Poland
- Voivodeship: Masovian
- County: Ostrołęka
- Gmina: Olszewo-Borki

Białobrzeg Bliższy [bjaˈwɔbʐɛk ˈbliʂʂɨ] is a village in the administrative district of Gmina Olszewo-Borki, within Ostrołęka County, Masovian Voivodeship, in east-central Poland.
