= Wojsze =

- Village
- Location within Poland
- Coordinates: 52°58′N 21°42′E
- Country: Poland
- Voivodeship: Masovian
- County: Ostrołęka
- Gmina: Czerwin

Wojsze [ˈvɔi̯ʂɛ] is a village in the administrative district of Gmina Czerwin, within Ostrołęka County, Masovian Voivodeship, in east-central Poland.
