= Grodzisk-Wieś =

Village in Gmina Czerwin, Poland

- Village
- Location within Poland
- Coordinates: 52°58′06″N 21°42′38″E
- Country: Poland
- Voivodeship: Masovian
- County: Ostrołęka
- Gmina: Czerwin

Grodzisk-Wieś [ˈɡrɔd͡ʑisk ˈvjɛɕ] is a village in the administrative district of Gmina Czerwin, within Ostrołęka County, Masovian Voivodeship, in east-central Poland.
