= Walery, Masovian Voivodeship =

Walery
- Village
- Location within Poland
- Coordinates: 53°8′44″N 21°37′10″E
- Country: Poland
- Voivodeship: Masovian
- County: Ostrołęka
- Gmina: Lelis

Walery [vaˈlɛrɨ] is a village in the administrative district of Gmina Lelis, within Ostrołęka County, Masovian Voivodeship, in east-central Poland.
