= Laskowiec, Masovian Voivodeship =

Laskowiec
- Village
- Location within Poland
- Coordinates: 53°7′12″N 21°39′50″E
- Country: Poland
- Voivodeship: Masovian
- County: Ostrołęka
- Gmina: Rzekuń

Laskowiec [lasˈkɔvjɛt͡s] is a village in the administrative district of Gmina Rzekuń, within Ostrołęka County, Masovian Voivodeship, in east-central Poland.
