= Kamianka, Ostrołęka County =

Kamianka
- Village
- Location within Poland
- Coordinates: 53°0′N 21°31′E
- Country: Poland
- Voivodeship: Masovian
- County: Ostrołęka
- Gmina: Rzekuń
- Time zone: UTC+1 (CET)
  - Summer (DST): UTC+2 (CEST)

Kamianka [kaˈmjanka] is a village in the administrative district of Gmina Rzekuń, within Ostrołęka County, Masovian Voivodeship in east-central Poland.

Eight Polish citizens were murdered by Nazi Germany in the village during World War II.
