= Rataje, Masovian Voivodeship =

Rataje
- Village
- Location within Poland
- Coordinates: 53°07′43″N 21°20′52″E
- Country: Poland
- Voivodeship: Masovian
- County: Ostrołęka
- Gmina: Olszewo-Borki

Rataje [raˈtajɛ] is a village in the administrative district of Gmina Olszewo-Borki, within Ostrołęka County, Masovian Voivodeship, in east-central Poland.
