= Choromany-Witnice =

- Village
- Location within Poland
- Coordinates: 52°58′17″N 21°52′21″E
- Country: Poland
- Voivodeship: Masovian
- County: Ostrołęka
- Gmina: Czerwin

Choromany-Witnice [xɔrɔˈmanɨ vitˈnit͡sɛ] is a village in the administrative district of Gmina Czerwin, within Ostrołęka County, Masovian Voivodeship, in east-central Poland.
