= Buczyn, Masovian Voivodeship =

Buczyn
- Village
- Location within Poland
- Coordinates: 52°57′05″N 21°46′59″E
- Country: Poland
- Voivodeship: Masovian
- County: Ostrołęka
- Gmina: Czerwin

Buczyn [ˈbut͡ʂɨn] is a village in the administrative district of Gmina Czerwin, within Ostrołęka County, Masovian Voivodeship, in east-central Poland.
