= Stare Malinowo =

- Village
- Location within Poland
- Coordinates: 52°54′40″N 21°47′11″E
- Country: Poland
- Voivodeship: Masovian
- County: Ostrołęka
- Gmina: Czerwin

Stare Malinowo [ˈstarɛ maliˈnɔvɔ] is a village in the administrative district of Gmina Czerwin, within Ostrołęka County, Masovian Voivodeship, in east-central Poland.
