= Laski Szlacheckie =

- Village
- Location within Poland
- Coordinates: 52°56′N 21°48′E
- Country: Poland
- Voivodeship: Masovian
- County: Ostrołęka
- Gmina: Czerwin
- Time zone: UTC+1 (CET)
  - Summer (DST): UTC+2 (CEST)
- Vehicle registration: WOS

Laski Szlacheckie (Polish pronunciation: [ˈlaskʲi ʂlaˈxɛtskʲɛ]) is a village in the administrative district of Gmina Czerwin, within Ostrołęka County, Masovian Voivodeship, in east-central Poland.

During the German invasion of Poland, which started World War II, on September 10, 1939, Wehrmacht troops murdered 20 Polish inhabitants in the village (see also Nazi crimes against the Polish nation).
