= Nowe Przytuły =

- Village
- Location within Poland
- Coordinates: 53°5′36″N 21°45′5″E
- Country: Poland
- Voivodeship: Masovian
- County: Ostrołęka
- Gmina: Rzekuń

Nowe Przytuły [ˈnɔvɛ pʂɨˈtuwɨ] is a village in the administrative district of Gmina Rzekuń, within Ostrołęka County, Masovian Voivodeship, in east-central Poland.
