= Łodziska =

- Village
- Location within Poland
- Coordinates: 53°9′26″N 21°29′05″E
- Country: Poland
- Voivodeship: Masovian
- County: Ostrołęka
- Gmina: Lelis

Łodziska [wɔˈd͡ʑiska] is a village in the administrative district of Gmina Lelis, within Ostrołęka County, Masovian Voivodeship, in east-central Poland.
