= Przytuły Stare =

- Village
- Location within Poland
- Coordinates: 53°6′10″N 21°42′47″E
- Country: Poland
- Voivodeship: Masovian
- County: Ostrołęka
- Gmina: Rzekuń

Przytuły Stare [pʂɨˈtuwɨ ˈstarɛ] is a village in the administrative district of Gmina Rzekuń, within Ostrołęka County, Masovian Voivodeship, in east-central Poland.
