= Myszyniec-Koryta =

- Village
- Location within Poland
- Coordinates: 53°23′39″N 21°17′28″E
- Country: Poland
- Voivodeship: Masovian
- County: Ostrołęka
- Gmina: Myszyniec

Myszyniec-Koryta [mɨˈʂɨɲɛt͡s kɔˈrɨta] is a village in the administrative district of Gmina Myszyniec, within Ostrołęka County, Masovian Voivodeship, in east-central Poland.
