= Olszyny, Masovian Voivodeship =

Olszyny
- Village
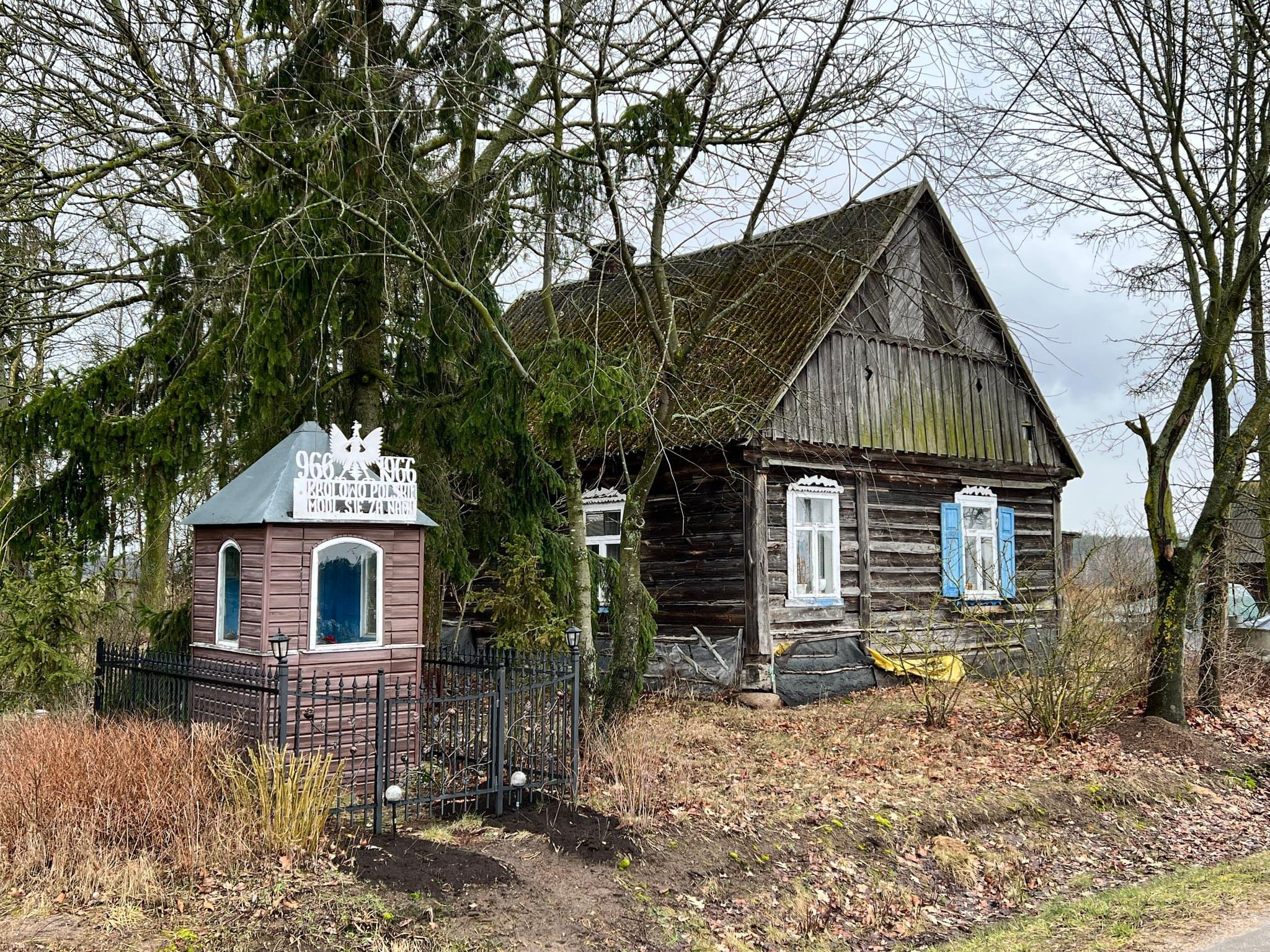

- Location within Poland
- Coordinates: 53°18′13″N 21°17′03″E
- Country: Poland
- Voivodeship: Masovian
- County: Ostrołęka
- Gmina: Myszyniec
- Time zone: UTC+1 (CET)
  - Summer (DST): UTC+2 (CEST)
- Vehicle registration: WOS

Olszyny [ɔlˈʂɨnɨ] is a village in the administrative district of Gmina Myszyniec, within Ostrołęka County, Masovian Voivodeship, in east-central Poland.
