= Grodzisk Duży =

Village in Gmina Czerwin, Poland

- Village
- Location within Poland
- Coordinates: 52°57′46″N 21°43′55″E
- Country: Poland
- Voivodeship: Masovian
- County: Ostrołęka
- Gmina: Czerwin

Grodzisk Duży [ˈɡrɔd͡ʑisk ˈduʐɨ] is a village in the administrative district of Gmina Czerwin, within Ostrołęka County, Masovian Voivodeship, in east-central Poland.
