= Dąbek =

Dąbek may refer to the following places:

- Dąbek, Kuyavian-Pomeranian Voivodeship (north-central Poland)
- Dąbek, Mława County in Masovian Voivodeship (east-central Poland)
- Dąbek, Gmina Czerwin in Masovian Voivodeship (east-central Poland)
- Dąbek, Gmina Troszyn in Masovian Voivodeship (east-central Poland)
- Dąbek, Silesian Voivodeship (south Poland)

Dąbek is also a surname. Notable people with the surname include:

- Stanisław Dąbek
