= Nowy Susk, Ostrołęka County =

Nowy Susk
- Village
- Location within Poland
- Coordinates: 53°03′03″N 21°40′05″E
- Country: Poland
- Voivodeship: Masovian
- County: Ostrołęka
- Gmina: Rzekuń
- Population (approx.): 400

Nowy Susk [ˈnɔvɨ ˈsusk] is a village in the administrative district of Gmina Rzekuń, within Ostrołęka County, Masovian Voivodeship, in east-central Poland.
