= Zabiele, Ostrołęka County =

Zabiele
- Village
- Location within Poland
- Coordinates: 53°4′41″N 21°42′37″E
- Country: Poland
- Voivodeship: Masovian
- County: Ostrołęka
- Gmina: Rzekuń

Zabiele [zaˈbjɛlɛ] is a village in the administrative district of Gmina Rzekuń, within Ostrołęka County, Masovian Voivodeship, in east-central Poland.
