= Piotrowo, Masovian Voivodeship =

Piotrowo
- Village
- Location within Poland
- Coordinates: 52°58′23″N 21°55′43″E
- Country: Poland
- Voivodeship: Masovian
- County: Ostrołęka
- Gmina: Czerwin

Piotrowo [pjɔˈtrɔvɔ] is a village in the administrative district of Gmina Czerwin, within Ostrołęka County, Masovian Voivodeship, in east-central Poland.
