= Drezewo =

Drezewo may refer to the following places in Poland:

- Dreżewo, West Pomeranian Voivodeship
- Drężewo, Masovian Voivodeship
