= Zalesie, Gmina Myszyniec =

Zalesie
- Village
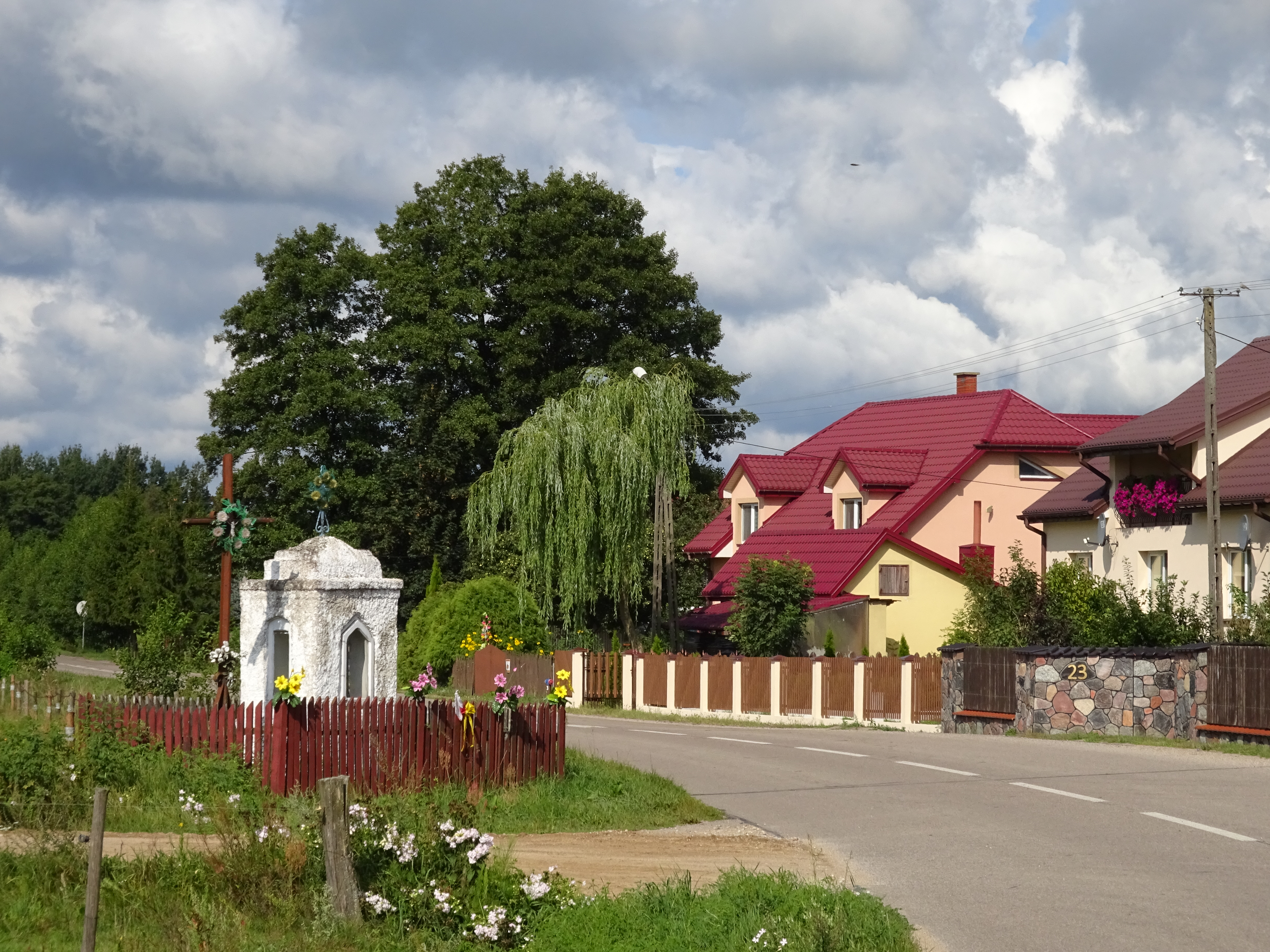

- Location within Poland
- Coordinates: 53°19′N 21°21′E
- Country: Poland
- Voivodeship: Masovian
- County: Ostrołęka
- Gmina: Myszyniec
- Time zone: UTC+1 (CET)
  - Summer (DST): UTC+2 (CEST)
- Postal code: 07-430

Zalesie [zaˈlɛɕɛ] is a village in the administrative district of Gmina Myszyniec, within Ostrołęka County, Masovian Voivodeship, in east-central Poland.

== History ==
Two Polish citizens were murdered by Nazi Germany in the village during World War II.
