= Mostowo =

Mostowo may refer to the following places:

- Mostowo, Mława County in Masovian Voivodeship (east-central Poland)
- Mostowo, Ostrołęka County in Masovian Voivodeship (east-central Poland)
- Mostowo, West Pomeranian Voivodeship (north-west Poland)
