= Żerań Duży =

- Village
- Location within Poland
- Coordinates: 53°2′N 21°30′E
- Country: Poland
- Voivodeship: Masovian
- County: Ostrołęka
- Gmina: Olszewo-Borki

Żerań Duży [ˈʐɛraɲ ˈduʐɨ] is a village in the administrative district of Gmina Olszewo-Borki, within Ostrołęka County, Masovian Voivodeship, in east-central Poland. The village had a population of 39 according to the 2021 census.
