= Suchcice, Masovian Voivodeship =

Suchcice
- Village
- Location within Poland
- Coordinates: 52°56′N 21°39′E
- Country: Poland
- Voivodeship: Masovian
- County: Ostrołęka
- Gmina: Czerwin
- Time zone: UTC+1 (CET)
  - Summer (DST): UTC+2 (CEST)

Suchcice [suxˈt͡ɕit͡sɛ] is a village in the administrative district of Gmina Czerwin, within Ostrołęka County, Masovian Voivodeship, in east-central Poland.

Six Polish citizens were murdered by Nazi Germany in the village during World War II.
