= Ołdaki, Ostrołęka County =

Ołdaki
- Village
- Location within Poland
- Coordinates: 53°6′N 21°42′E
- Country: Poland
- Voivodeship: Masovian
- County: Ostrołęka
- Gmina: Rzekuń

Ołdaki [ɔu̯ˈdaki] is a village in the administrative district of Gmina Rzekuń, within Ostrołęka County, Masovian Voivodeship, in east-central Poland.
