= Żebry-Stara Wieś =

- Village
- Location within Poland
- Coordinates: 53°1′46″N 21°25′56″E
- Country: Poland
- Voivodeship: Masovian
- County: Ostrołęka
- Gmina: Olszewo-Borki
- Time zone: UTC+1 (CET)
  - Summer (DST): UTC+2 (CEST)

Żebry-Stara Wieś [ˈʐɛbrɨ ˈstara ˈvjɛɕ] is a village in the administrative district of Gmina Olszewo-Borki, within Ostrołęka County, Masovian Voivodeship, in east-central Poland.

Nine Polish citizens were murdered by Nazi Germany in the village during World War II.
