= Pomianowo =

Pomianowo may refer to:

- Pomianowo, Masovian Voivodeship, Poland
- Pomianowo, West Pomeranian Voivodeship, Poland

== See also ==
- Pomian (disambiguation)
