= Nakły =

- Village
- Location within Poland
- Coordinates: 53°4′7″N 21°29′43″E
- Country: Poland
- Voivodeship: Masovian
- County: Ostrołęka
- Gmina: Olszewo-Borki

Nakły [ˈnakwɨ] is a village in the administrative district of Gmina Olszewo-Borki, within Ostrołęka County, Masovian Voivodeship, in east-central Poland.
