= Księżopole =

- Village
- Location within Poland
- Coordinates: 52°58′02″N 21°50′31″E
- Country: Poland
- Voivodeship: Masovian
- County: Ostrołęka
- Gmina: Czerwin

Księżopole [kɕɛ̃ʐɔˈpɔlɛ] is a village in the administrative district of Gmina Czerwin, within Ostrołęka County, Masovian Voivodeship, in east-central Poland.
