= Nowa Wieś, Ostrołęka County =

Nowa Wieś
- Village
- Location within Poland
- Coordinates: 53°5′11″N 21°24′39″E
- Country: Poland
- Voivodeship: Masovian
- County: Ostrołęka
- Gmina: Olszewo-Borki
- Population: 550

Nowa Wieś [ˈnɔva ˈvjɛɕ] is a village in the administrative district of Gmina Olszewo-Borki, within Ostrołęka County, Masovian Voivodeship, in east-central Poland.
