= Janki Młode =

- Village
- Location within Poland
- Coordinates: 52°58′59″N 21°39′48″E
- Country: Poland
- Voivodeship: Masovian
- County: Ostrołęka
- Gmina: Czerwin

Janki Młode [ˈjanki ˈmwɔdɛ] is a village in the administrative district of Gmina Czerwin, within Ostrołęka County, Masovian Voivodeship, in east-central Poland.
