= Dzbenin, Gmina Rzekuń =

Dzbenin
- Village
- Location within Poland
- Coordinates: 53°02′46″N 21°33′12″E
- Country: Poland
- Voivodeship: Masovian
- County: Ostrołęka
- Gmina: Rzekuń
- Time zone: UTC+1 (CET)
  - Summer (DST): UTC+2 (CEST)

Dzbenin [ˈd͡zbɛnin] is a village in the administrative district of Gmina Rzekuń, within Ostrołęka County, Masovian Voivodeship, in northeastern Poland.

Six Polish citizens were murdered by Nazi Germany in the village during World War II.
