= Ladies' man =

A ladies' man or lady's man is a man who enjoys spending time socially with women, who strives to please them and that women find attractive.

Ladies' man or lady's man may also refer to:

== Literature ==
- Ladies' Man (novel), a 1978 novel by Richard Price

== Film ==
- Ladies' Man (1931 film), starring William Powell
- Ladies' Man (1947 film), an American film starring Eddie Bracken
- The Ladies Man, a 1961 Jerry Lewis film
- The Ladies Man (2000 film), a film about the Saturday Night Live character
- Ladies' Man: A MADE Movie, a 2013 MTV movie starring Dave Randolph-Mayhem Davis

== Television ==
- Ladies' Man (1980 TV series), an American sitcom starring Lawrence Pressman
- Ladies Man (1999 TV series), a 1999 television sitcom starring Alfred Molina

=== Episodes ===
- Leon Phelps, The Ladies' Man, a Saturday Night Live character played by Tim Meadows
- "Lady's Man" (Law & Order: Criminal Intent), a 2009 episode of Criminal Intent
- "Ladies Man", episode 37 of the Nickelodeon TV show All Grown Up!

== Music ==
- Ladies Man, an alternative title for Science Fiction, an unauthorized live album by Alice Cooper
- Ladies Man (album), a 2001 album by Teddy Edwards
- "Ladies Man" (song), a 2000 single by New Zealand rock band The D4
- "Ladies' Man", a 1982 song by Joni Mitchell from her album Wild Things Run Fast

== See also ==
- Promiscuity, the practice of having casual sex frequently with different partners or being indiscriminate in the choice of sexual partners
- Lothario, a male given name that came to suggest an unscrupulous seducer of women in The Impertinent Curious Man, a metastory in Don Quixote
- Łady-Mans
