= Nożewo =

- Village
- Location within Poland
- Coordinates: 53°2′N 21°30′E
- Country: Poland
- Voivodeship: Masovian
- County: Ostrołęka
- Gmina: Olszewo-Borki
- Elevation: 91 m (299 ft)
- Population: 200

Nożewo [nɔˈʐɛvɔ] is a village in the administrative district of Gmina Olszewo-Borki, within Ostrołęka County, Masovian Voivodeship, in east-central Poland.
