= Krysiaki, Masovian Voivodeship =

Krysiaki
- Village
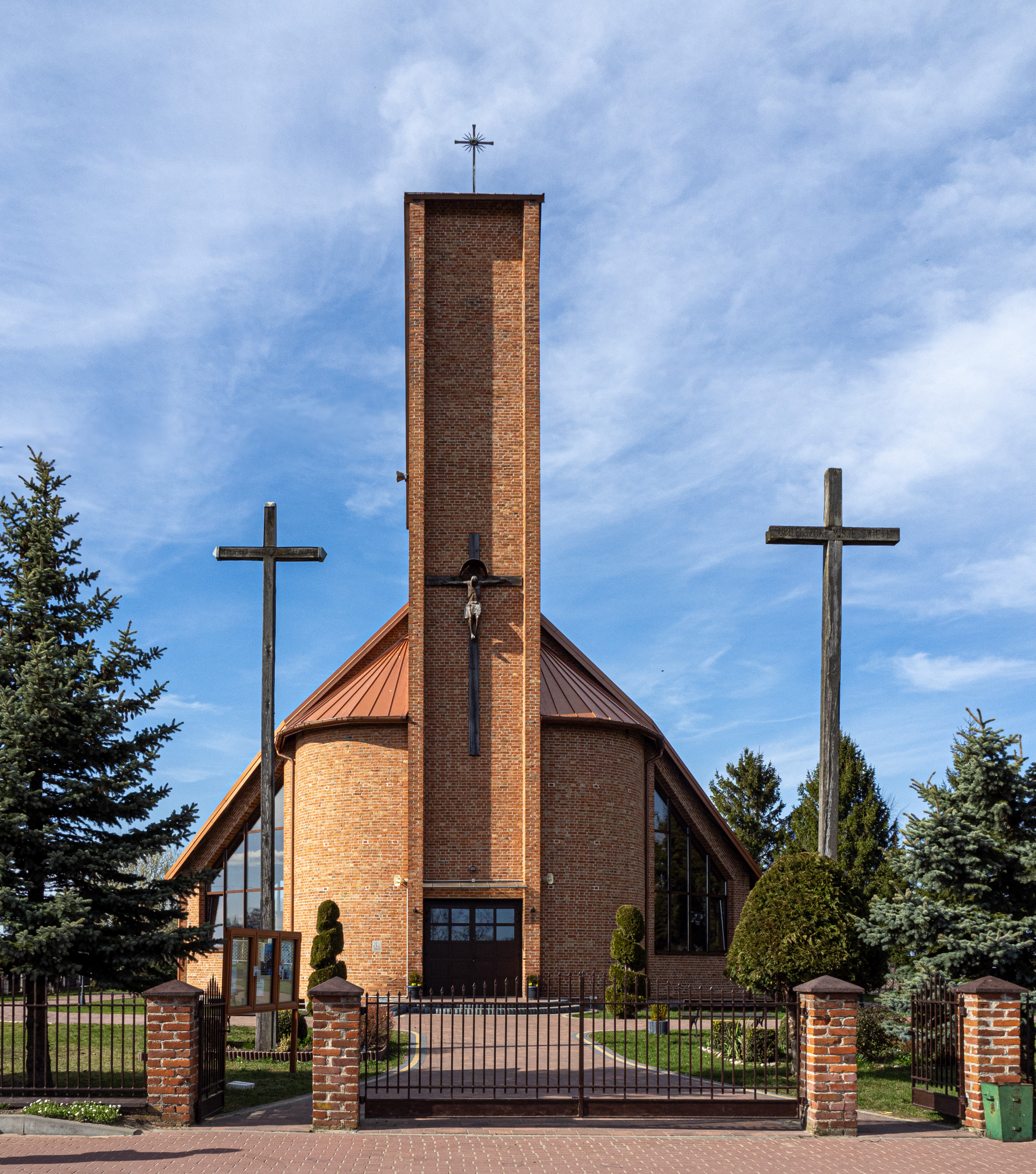
- Church of Our Lady Queen of the Polish Crown in Krysiaki

- Location within Poland
- Coordinates: 53°26′N 21°28′E
- Country: Poland
- Voivodeship: Masovian
- County: Ostrołęka
- Gmina: Myszyniec
- Time zone: UTC+1 (CET)
  - Summer (DST): UTC+2 (CEST)
- Vehicle registration: WOS

Krysiaki [krɨˈɕaki] is a village in the administrative district of Gmina Myszyniec, within Ostrołęka County, Masovian Voivodeship, in east-central Poland.
