= Tyszki-Gostery =

- Village
- Location within Poland
- Coordinates: 52°59′3″N 21°54′47″E
- Country: Poland
- Voivodeship: Masovian
- County: Ostrołęka
- Gmina: Czerwin
- Population (approx.): 60

Tyszki-Gostery [ˈtɨʂki ɡɔsˈtɛrɨ] is a village in the administrative district of Gmina Czerwin, within Ostrołęka County, Masovian Voivodeship, in east-central Poland.
