= Drężek =

- Village
- Location within Poland
- Coordinates: 53°22′18″N 21°22′54″E
- Country: Poland
- Voivodeship: Masovian
- County: Ostrołęka
- Gmina: Myszyniec

Drężek [ˈdrɛ̃ʐɛk] is a village in the administrative district of Gmina Myszyniec, within Ostrołęka County, Masovian Voivodeship, in east-central Poland.
