= Michałowo, Gmina Czarnia =

Michałowo
- Village
- Location within Poland
- Coordinates: 53°19′55″N 21°04′11″E
- Country: Poland
- Voivodeship: Masovian
- County: Ostrołęka
- Gmina: Czarnia

Michałowo [mixaˈwɔvɔ] is a village in the administrative district of Gmina Czarnia, within Ostrołęka County, Masovian Voivodeship, in east-central Poland.
