= Długi Kąt =

Długi Kąt may refer to the following places:

- Długi Kąt, Lublin Voivodeship (east Poland)
- Długi Kąt, Masovian Voivodeship (east-central Poland)
- Długi Kąt, Silesian Voivodeship (south Poland)
- Długi Kąt, Warmian-Masurian Voivodeship (north Poland)
