= Żebry-Żabin =

- Village
- Location within Poland
- Coordinates: 53°2′3″N 21°25′0″E
- Country: Poland
- Voivodeship: Masovian
- County: Ostrołęka
- Gmina: Olszewo-Borki

Żebry-Żabin [ˈʐɛbrɨ ˈʐabin] is a village in the administrative district of Gmina Olszewo-Borki, within Ostrołęka County, Masovian Voivodeship, in east-central Poland.
