= Czarnowiec =

Czarnowiec may refer to the following places:

- Czarnowiec, Ostrołęka County in Masovian Voivodeship (east-central Poland)
- Czarnowiec, Otwock County in Masovian Voivodeship (east-central Poland)
- Czarnowiec, Warmian-Masurian Voivodeship (north Poland)
- Czarnowiec, West Pomeranian Voivodeship (north-west Poland)
