= Rzekuń =

- Village
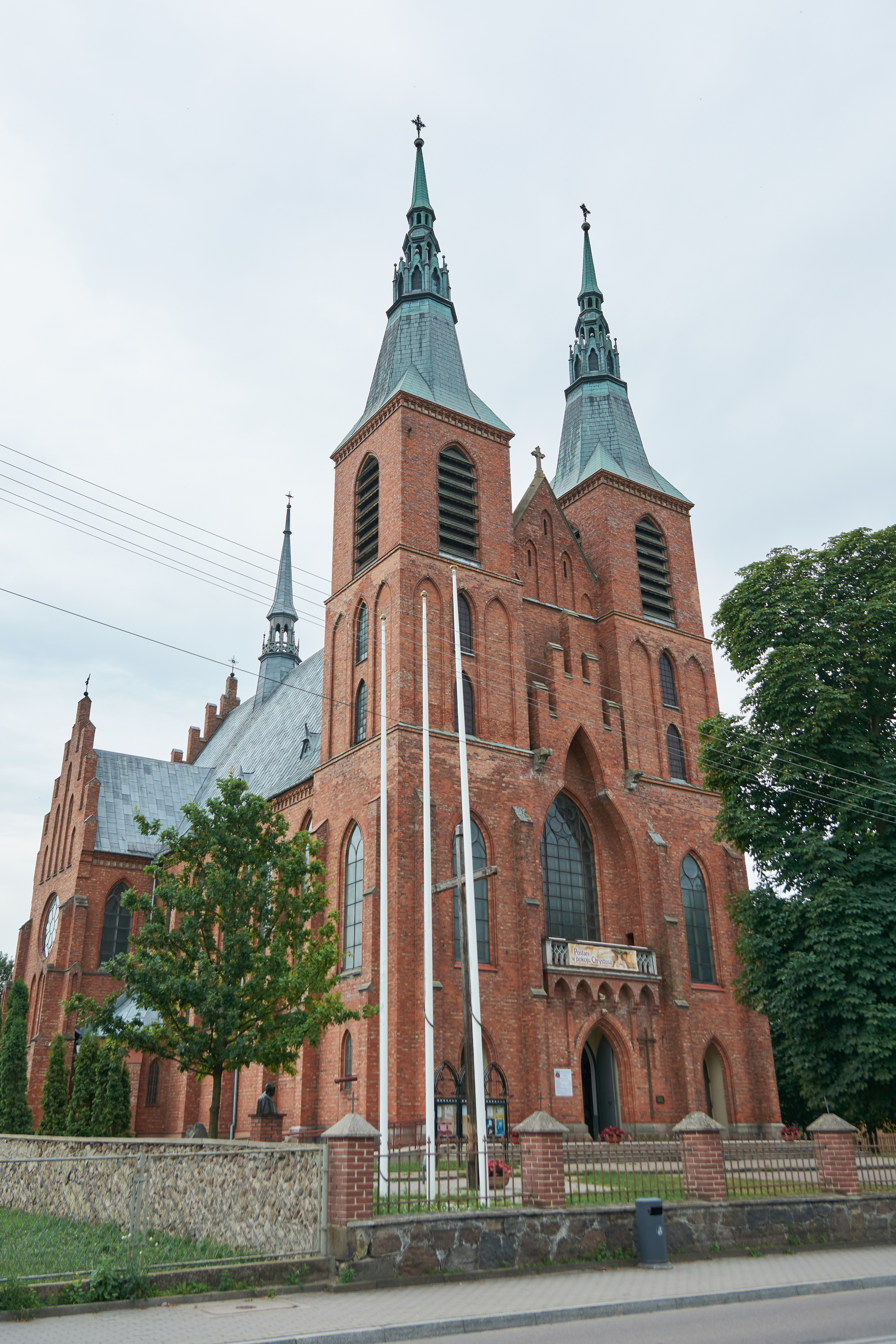
- Church of the Sacred Heart

- Location within Poland
- Coordinates: 53°3′N 21°38′E
- Country: Poland
- Voivodeship: Masovian
- County: Ostrołęka
- Gmina: Rzekuń

Population
  - Total: 1,800

Rzekuń [ˈʐɛkuɲ] is a village in Ostrołęka County, Masovian Voivodeship, in east-central Poland. It is the seat of the gmina (administrative district) called Gmina Rzekuń.
