= Lelis =

- Village
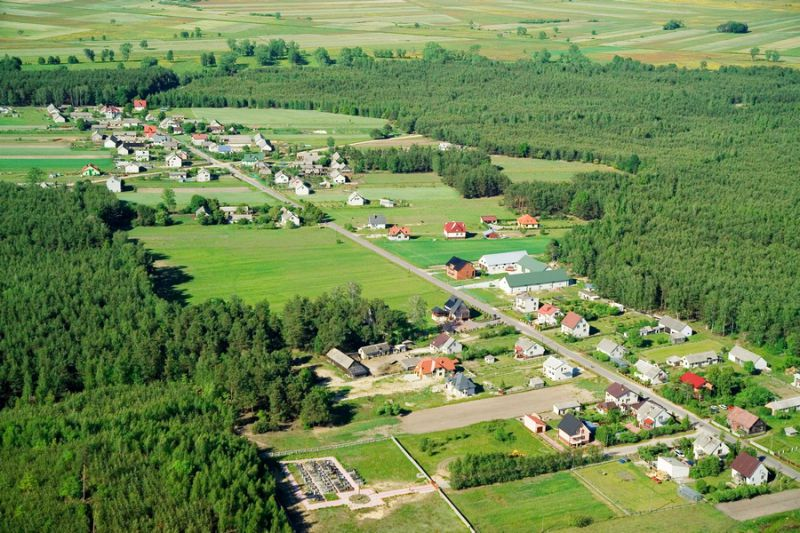
- Aerial view

- Location within Poland
- Coordinates: 53°10′52″N 21°33′26″E
- Country: Poland
- Voivodeship: Masovian
- County: Ostrołęka
- Gmina: Lelis

Lelis [ˈlɛlis] is a village in Ostrołęka County, Masovian Voivodeship, in east-central Poland. It is the seat of the gmina (administrative district) called Gmina Lelis.
