= Czerwin =

- Village
- Location within Poland
- Coordinates: 52°56′47″N 21°45′40″E
- Country: Poland
- Voivodeship: Masovian
- County: Ostrołęka
- Gmina: Czerwin
- Highest elevation: 150 m (490 ft)
- Lowest elevation: 100 m (330 ft)
- Population: 800
- Website: www.czerwin.pl

Czerwin [ˈt͡ʂɛrvin] is a village in Ostrołęka County, Masovian Voivodeship, in east-central Poland. It is the seat of the gmina (administrative district) called Gmina Czerwin.
