= Gmina Czarnia =

Gmina Czarnia Czarnia Commune
- Gmina
- Flag Coat of arms

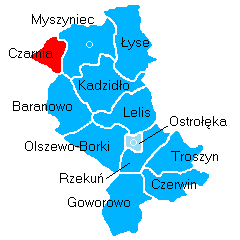

- Location within Poland
- Coordinates (Czarnia): 53°21′N 21°13′E
- Country: Poland
- Voivodeship: Masovian
- County: Ostrołęka County
- Seat: Czarnia

Area
  - Total: 92.53 km^{2} (35.73 sq mi)

Population (2011)
  - Total: 2,756
  - Density: 29.78/km^{2} (77.14/sq mi)
- Website: www.czarnia.samorzady.pl

Gmina Czarnia is a rural gmina (administrative district) in Ostrołęka County, Masovian Voivodeship, in east-central Poland. Its seat is the village of Czarnia, which lies approximately 40 kilometres (25 mi) north-west of Ostrołęka and 127 km (79 mi) north of Warsaw.

The gmina covers an area of 92.53 square kilometres (35.7 sq mi), and as of 2006 its total population is 2,620 (2,756 in 2011).

== Villages ==
Gmina Czarnia contains the villages and settlements of Bandysie, Brzozowy Kąt, Cupel, Cyk, Czarnia, Długie, Michałowo, Rutkowo and Surowe.

== Neighbouring gminas ==
Gmina Czarnia is bordered by the gminas of Baranowo, Chorzele, Myszyniec, Rozogi and Wielbark.
