= Gmina Myszyniec =

Gmina Myszyniec Myszyniec Commune
- Gmina
- Coat of arms

- Location within Poland
- Coordinates (Myszyniec): 53°22′56″N 21°21′5″E
- Country: Poland
- Voivodeship: Masovian
- County: Ostrołęka County
- Seat: Myszyniec

Area
  - Total: 228.59 km^{2} (88.26 sq mi)

Population (2011)
  - Total: 10,577
  - Density: 46.271/km^{2} (119.84/sq mi)
  - Urban: 3,117
  - Rural: 7,460
- Website: www.myszyniec.pl

Gmina Myszyniec is an urban-rural gmina (administrative district) in Ostrołęka County, Masovian Voivodeship, in east-central Poland. Its seat is the town of Myszyniec, which lies approximately 38 kilometres (24 mi) north of Ostrołęka and 132 km (82 mi) north of Warsaw.

The gmina covers an area of 228.59 square kilometres (88.3 sq mi), and as of 2006 its total population is 10,182 (out of which the population of Myszyniec amounts to 3,014, and the population of the rural part of the gmina is 7,168).

== Villages ==
Apart from the town of Myszyniec, Gmina Myszyniec contains the villages and settlements of Białusny Lasek, Charciabałda, Cięćk, Drężek, Gadomskie, Krysiaki, Myszyniec-Koryta, Niedźwiedź, Olszyny, Pełty, Stary Myszyniec, Świdwiborek, Wolkowe, Wydmusy, Wykrot, Zalesie and Zdunek.

== Neighbouring gminas ==
Gmina Myszyniec is bordered by the gminas of Baranowo, Czarnia, Kadzidło, Łyse and Rozogi.
