= Olszewo-Borki =

- Village
- Location within Poland
- Coordinates: 53°4′N 21°31′E
- Country: Poland
- Voivodeship: Masovian
- County: Ostrołęka
- Gmina: Olszewo-Borki
- Population: 820

Olszewo-Borki [ɔlˈʂɛvɔ ˈbɔrki] is a village in Ostrołęka County, Masovian Voivodeship, in east-central Poland. It is the seat of the gmina (administrative district) called Gmina Olszewo-Borki.
