= Gmina Lelis =

Gmina Lelis Lelis Commune
- Gmina
- Coat of arms

- Location within Poland
- Coordinates (Lelis): 53°10′52″N 21°33′26″E
- Country: Poland
- Voivodeship: Masovian
- County: Ostrołęka County
- Seat: Lelis

Area
  - Total: 197 km^{2} (76 sq mi)

Population (2011)
  - Total: 8,930
  - Density: 45.3/km^{2} (117/sq mi)
- Website: http://www.lelis.ug.gov.pl/

Gmina Lelis is a rural gmina (administrative district) in Ostrołęka County, Masovian Voivodeship, in east-central Poland. Its seat is the village of Lelis, which lies approximately 13 kilometres (8 mi) north of Ostrołęka and 114 km (71 mi) north of Warsaw.

The gmina covers an area of 197 square kilometres (76.1 sq mi), and as of 2006 its total population is 8,364 (8,930 in 2011).

== Villages ==
Gmina Lelis contains the villages and settlements of Białobiel, Dąbrówka, Długi Kąt, Durlasy, Gąski, Gibałka, Gnaty, Kurpiewskie, Łęg Przedmiejski, Łęg Starościński, Lelis, Łodziska, Nasiadki, Obierwia, Olszewka, Płoszyce, Siemnocha, Szafarczyska, Szafarnia, Szkwa, Szwendrowy Most and Walery.

== Neighbouring gminas ==
Gmina Lelis is bordered by the gminas of Baranowo, Kadzidło, Miastkowo, Olszewo-Borki, Rzekuń and Zbójna.
