= Czarnia, Gmina Czarnia =

Czarnia
- Village
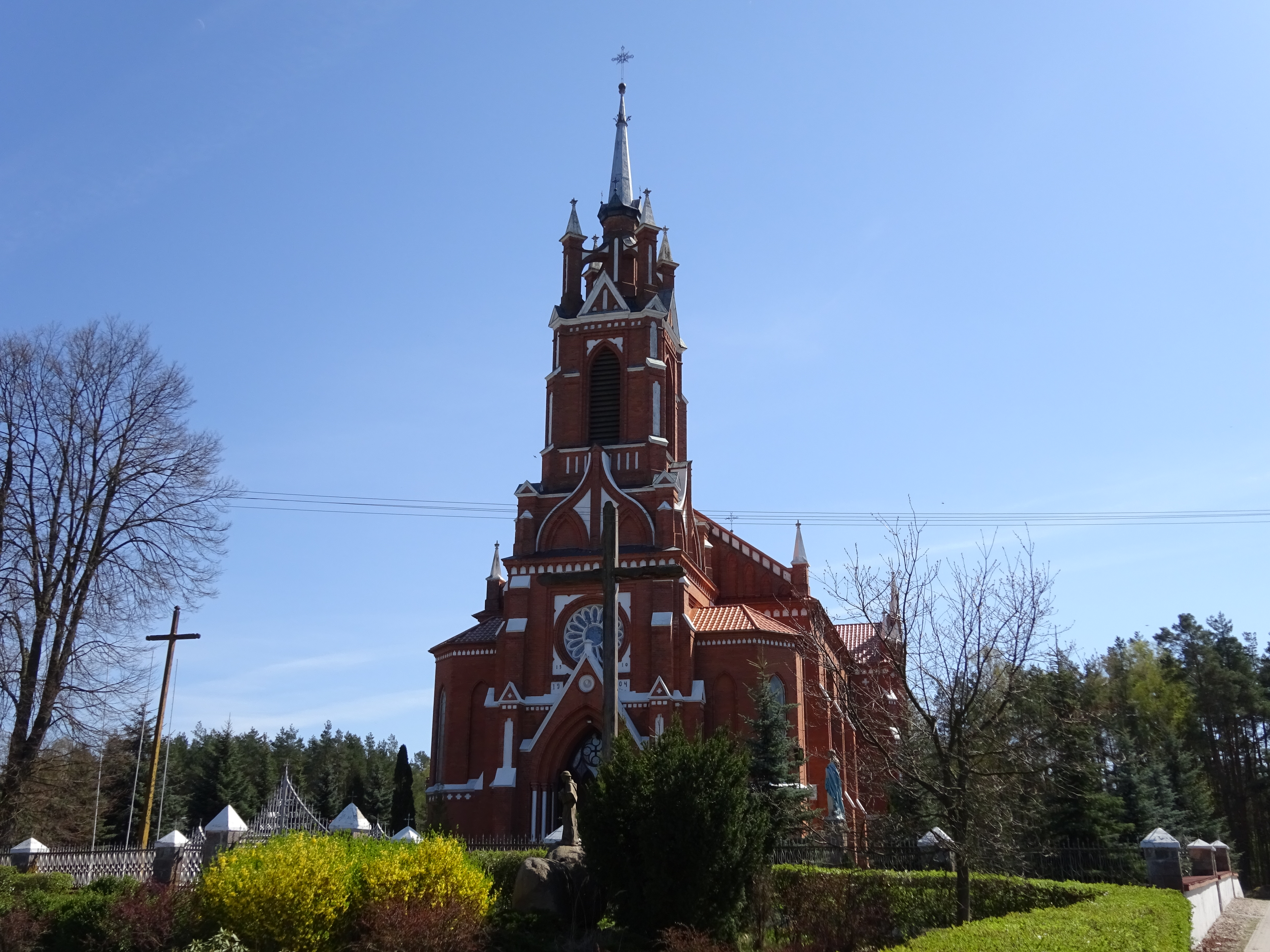
- Church of the Immaculate Conception of the Virgin Mary

- Location within Poland
- Coordinates: 53°21′N 21°13′E
- Country: Poland
- Voivodeship: Masovian
- County: Ostrołęka
- Gmina: Czarnia

Czarnia [ˈt͡ʂarɲa] is a village in Ostrołęka County, Masovian Voivodeship, in east-central Poland. It is the seat of the gmina (administrative district) called Gmina Czarnia.
