= Łady-Mans =

Village in Gmina Czerwin, Poland

- Village
- Location within Poland
- Coordinates: 52°59′05″N 21°47′15″E
- Country: Poland
- Voivodeship: Masovian
- County: Ostrołęka
- Gmina: Czerwin

Łady-Mans [ˈwadɨ ˈmans] is a village in the administrative district of Gmina Czerwin, within Ostrołęka County, Masovian Voivodeship, in east-central Poland.
