= Dąbek, Gmina Czerwin =

Dąbek
- Village
- Location within Poland
- Coordinates: 52°57′20″N 21°47′38″E
- Country: Poland
- Voivodeship: Masovian
- County: Ostrołęka
- Gmina: Czerwin

Dąbek [ˈdɔmbɛk] is a village in the administrative district of Gmina Czerwin, within Ostrołęka County, Masovian Voivodeship, in east-central Poland.
