= Gmina Czerwin =

Gmina Czerwin Czerwin Commune
- Gmina
- Flag Coat of arms

- Location within Poland
- Coordinates (Czerwin): 52°56′47″N 21°45′40″E
- Country: Poland
- Voivodeship: Masovian
- County: Ostrołęka County
- Seat: Czerwin

Area
  - Total: 171.13 km^{2} (66.07 sq mi)

Population (2011)
  - Total: 5,185
  - Density: 30.30/km^{2} (78.47/sq mi)
- Website: https://www.czerwin.pl

Gmina Czerwin is a rural gmina (administrative district) in Ostrołęka County, Masovian Voivodeship, in east-central Poland. Its seat is the village of Czerwin, which lies approximately 19 kilometres (12 mi) south-east of Ostrołęka and 96 km (60 mi) north-east of Warsaw.

The gmina covers an area of 171.13 square kilometres (66.1 sq mi), and as of 2006 its total population is 5,265 (5,185 in 2011).

== Villages ==
Gmina Czerwin contains the villages and settlements of Andrzejki-Tyszki, Bobin, Borek, Buczyn, Choromany-Witnice, Chruśnice, Czerwin, Dąbek, Damiany, Dzwonek, Filochy, Gocły, Grodzisk Duży, Grodzisk-Wieś, Gumki, Janki Młode, Jarnuty, Księżopole, Łady-Mans, Laski Szlacheckie, Laski Włościańskie, Nowe Dobki, Nowe Malinowo, Piotrowo, Piski, Pomian, Seroczyn, Skarżyn, Sokołowo, Stare Dobki, Stare Malinowo, Stylągi, Suchcice, Tomasze, Tyszki-Ciągaczki, Tyszki-Gostery, Tyszki-Nadbory, Wiśniewo, Wiśniówek, Wojsze, Wólka Czerwińska, Wólka Seroczyńska, Załuski, Zaorze and Żochy.

== Neighbouring gminas ==
Gmina Czerwin is bordered by the gminas of Goworowo, Ostrów Mazowiecka, Rzekuń, Śniadowo, Stary Lubotyń, Troszyn and Wąsewo.
