= Czarnowiec, Ostrołęka County =

Czarnowiec
- Village
- Location within Poland
- Coordinates: 53°02′15″N 21°36′13″E
- Country: Poland
- Voivodeship: Masovian
- County: Ostrołęka
- Gmina: Rzekuń

Czarnowiec [t͡ʂarˈnɔvjɛt͡s] is a village in the administrative district of Gmina Rzekuń, within Ostrołęka County, Masovian Voivodeship, in east-central Poland.
