= Gmina Olszewo-Borki =

Gmina Olszewo-Borki Olszewo-Borki Commune
- Gmina
- Flag Coat of arms

- Location within Poland
- Coordinates (Olszewo-Borki): 53°4′N 21°31′E
- Country: Poland
- Voivodeship: Masovian
- County: Ostrołęka County
- Seat: Olszewo-Borki

Area
  - Total: 195.75 km^{2} (75.58 sq mi)

Population (2011)
  - Total: 10,098
  - Density: 51.586/km^{2} (133.61/sq mi)

Gmina Olszewo-Borki is a rural gmina (administrative district) in Ostrołęka County, Masovian Voivodeship, in east-central Poland. Its seat is the village of Olszewo-Borki, which lies approximately 3 kilometres (2 mi) south-west of Ostrołęka and 99 km (61 mi) north-east of Warsaw.

The gmina covers an area of 195.75 square kilometres (75.6 sq mi), and as of 2006 its total population is 9,505 (10,098 in 2011).

== Villages ==
Gmina Olszewo-Borki contains the villages and settlements of Antonie, Białobrzeg Bliższy, Białobrzeg Dalszy, Chojniki, Dobrołęka, Drężewo, Działyń, Grabnik, Grabówek, Grabowo, Kordowo, Kruki, Łazy, Mostówek, Mostowo, Nakły, Nowa Wieś, Nożewo, Olszewo-Borki, Przystań, Rataje, Rżaniec, Stepna Stara, Stepna-Michałki, Wyszel, Zabiele Wielkie, Zabiele-Piliki, Zabrodzie, Żebry-Chudek, Żebry-Ostrowy, Żebry-Perosy, Żebry-Sławki, Żebry-Stara Wieś, Żebry-Wierzchlas, Żebry-Żabin, Żerań Duży and Żerań Mały.

== Neighbouring gminas ==
Gmina Olszewo-Borki is bordered by the city of Ostrołęka and by the gminas of Baranowo, Krasnosielc, Lelis, Młynarze, Rzekuń and Sypniewo.
