= Pomian =

Pomian may refer to:

- Pomian coat of arms
- Pomian, Masovian Voivodeship (east-central Poland)
- Krzysztof Pomian (born 1934), a Polish philosopher, historian and essayist
