= Daniszewo, Ostrołęka County =

Village in Masovian Voivodeship, Poland

Daniszewo
- Village
- Location within Poland
- Coordinates: 53°1′2″N 21°37′33″E
- Country: Poland
- Voivodeship: Masovian
- County: Ostrołęka
- Gmina: Rzekuń

Daniszewo [daniˈʂɛvɔ] is a village in the administrative district of Gmina Rzekuń, within Ostrołęka County, Masovian Voivodeship, in east-central Poland.
