= Pomian, Masovian Voivodeship =

Pomian
- Village
- Location within Poland
- Coordinates: 52°57′58″N 21°54′52″E
- Country: Poland
- Voivodeship: Masovian
- County: Ostrołęka
- Gmina: Czerwin

Pomian [ˈpɔmjan] is a village in the administrative district of Gmina Czerwin, within Ostrołęka County, Masovian Voivodeship, in east-central Poland.
