= Długi Kąt, Masovian Voivodeship =

Długi Kąt
- Village
- Location within Poland
- Coordinates: 53°12′19″N 21°32′35″E
- Country: Poland
- Voivodeship: Masovian
- County: Ostrołęka
- Gmina: Lelis

Długi Kąt [ˈdwuɡi ˈkɔnt] is a village in the administrative district of Gmina Lelis, within Ostrołęka County, Masovian Voivodeship, in east-central Poland.
