= Gmina Rzekuń =

Gmina Rzekuń Rzekuń Commune
- Gmina
- Flag Coat of arms

- Location within Poland
- Coordinates (Rzekuń): 53°3′N 21°38′E
- Country: Poland
- Voivodeship: Masovian
- County: Ostrołęka County
- Seat: Rzekuń

Area
  - Total: 135.5 km^{2} (52.3 sq mi)

Population (2011)
  - Total: 9,757
  - Density: 72.01/km^{2} (186.5/sq mi)
- Website: http://www.rzekun.pl

Gmina Rzekuń is a rural gmina (administrative district) in Ostrołęka County, Masovian Voivodeship, in east-central Poland. Its seat is the village of Rzekuń, which lies approximately 5 kilometres (3 mi) south-east of Ostrołęka and 102 km (63 mi) north-east of Warsaw.

The gmina covers an area of 135.5 square kilometres (52.3 sq mi), and as of 2006 its total population is 9,080 (9,757 in 2011).

== Villages ==
Gmina Rzekuń contains the villages and settlements of Borawe, Czarnowiec, Daniszewo, Drwęcz, Dzbenin, Goworki, Kamianka, Korczaki, Laskowiec, Ławy, Nowa Wieś Wschodnia, Nowe Przytuły, Nowy Susk, Ołdaki, Przytuły Stare, Rozwory, Rzekuń, Stary Susk, Teodorowo, Tobolice and Zabiele, Stacja.

== Neighbouring gminas ==
Gmina Rzekuń is bordered by the city of Ostrołęka and by the gminas of Czerwin, Goworowo, Lelis, Miastkowo, Młynarze, Olszewo-Borki and Troszyn.
