= Ostrołęka County =

Ostrołęka County Powiat ostrołęcki
- County
- Flag Coat of arms

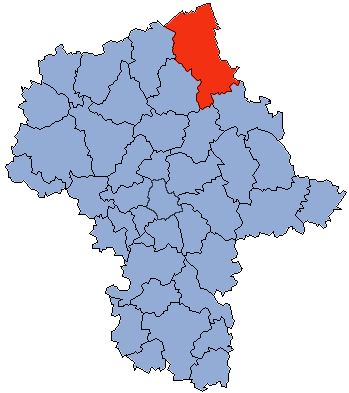
- Location within the voivodeship

- Division into gminas
- Coordinates (Ostrołęka): 53°4′N 21°34′E
- Country: Poland
- Voivodeship: Masovian
- Seat: Ostrołęka
- Gminas: Total 11: Gmina Baranowo; Gmina Czarnia; Gmina Czerwin; Gmina Goworowo; Gmina Kadzidło; Gmina Lelis; Gmina Łyse; Gmina Myszyniec; Gmina Olszewo-Borki; Gmina Rzekuń; Gmina Troszyn

Area
  - Total: 2,099.32 km^{2} (810.55 sq mi)

Population (2019)
  - Total: 88,717
  - Density: 42.260/km^{2} (109.45/sq mi)
  - Urban: 3,408
  - Rural: 85,309
- Car plates: WOS
- Website: powiatostrolecki.pl

Ostrołęka County (Polish: powiat ostrołęcki) is a unit of territorial administration and local government (powiat) in Masovian Voivodeship, east-central Poland. It came into being on January 1, 1999, as a result of the Polish local government reforms passed in 1998. Its administrative seat is the city of Ostrołęka, although the city is not part of the county (it constitutes a separate city county). The only town in Ostrołęka County is Myszyniec, which lies 38 km (24 mi) north of Ostrołęka.

The county covers an area of 2,099.32 square kilometres (810.6 sq mi). As of 2019 its total population is 88,717, out of which the population of Myszyniec is 3,408 and the rural population is 85,309.

== Neighbouring counties ==
Apart from the city of Ostrołęka, Ostrołęka County is also bordered by Pisz County and Kolno County to the north, Łomża County to the east, Ostrów County to the south-east, Wyszków County to the south, Maków County to the south-west, Przasnysz County to the west, and Szczytno County to the north-west.

== Administrative divisions ==
The county is subdivided into 11 gminas (one urban-rural and 10 rural). These are listed in the following table, in descending order of population.

Gmina	Type	Area (km²)	Population (2019)	Seat
Gmina Kadzidło	rural	258.9	11,399	Kadzidło
Gmina Olszewo-Borki	rural	195.8	10,759	Olszewo-Borki
Gmina Rzekuń	rural	135.5	10,757	Rzekuń
Gmina Myszyniec	urban-rural	228.6	10,459	Myszyniec
Gmina Lelis	rural	197.0	9,696	Lelis
Gmina Łyse	rural	246.5	8,421	Łyse
Gmina Goworowo	rural	218.9	8,311	Goworowo
Gmina Baranowo	rural	198.2	6,489	Baranowo
Gmina Czerwin	rural	171.1	5,107	Czerwin
Gmina Troszyn	rural	156.3	4,765	Troszyn
Gmina Czarnia	rural	92.5	2,554	Czarnia
