= Duchy of Sieluń =

Complex of landed estates in northern Mazovia

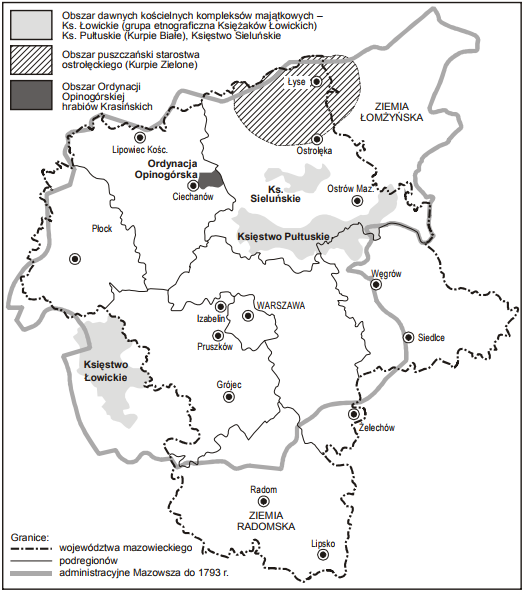
Duchy of Sieluń and other large ecclesiastical estates on the map of Mazovia

The Duchy of Sieluń or the Sieluń Estate was a complex of landed estates in northern Mazovia, centered in Sieluń, which served as the benefice of the provost of the chapter of the cathedral church in Płock, known as the cathedral parson. From 1598 (and permanently from the 18th century), the provosts began using the ducal title, and the estate itself came to be referred to as a duchy. This usurpation was legalized during the Great Sejm; however, the provosts lost authority over the petty nobility residing within these lands. After the Third Partition of Poland in 1795, the Sieluń Estate was secularized and seized by the Kingdom of Prussia. During the era of the Duchy of Warsaw, it became the property of Marshal of France Michel Ney, but after the Congress of Vienna, it was taken over by the government of Congress Poland. Nonetheless, the cathedral provosts of Płock continued to use the ducal title until 1817.

== Location and territory ==
The Sieluń Estate encompassed the area of three parishes situated on both sides of the Narew river – Sieluń, Gąsewo, and Goworowo – as well as part of the Rzekuń parish. The estate's northern boundary was marked by the Omulew river, while its southern boundary extended to the Orzyc river on the right side of the Narew and the Orz rivers on the left. To the west, the estate reached near Krasnosielc and Maków Mazowiecki (without including these villages), while its eastern limit was the village of Tomasze. The estate consisted of five local administrative units and 17 villages, organized into five domains:

- Sieluń Domain – included the villages of Sieluń and Kruszewo, as well as the administrative unit of Dyszobaba.
- Gąsewo Domain – included the villages of Gąsewo, Szczeglino, Zamość, Dylewo, Sławkowo, and four administrative units: Szczegilno, Sypniewo, Dylewo, and Sławkowo.
- Pokrzywnica Domain – included the villages of Pokrzywnica and Żabin.
- Rembiszów Domain – included the villages of Goworowo, Rębisze-Kolonia, Stare Jawory, and Goworówek.
- Borawe Domain – included the villages of Borawe, Lipianka, and Kamianka.

In addition to these settlements, owned by parsons, the duchy also contained noble-owned villages. On the right bank of the Narew, these included Rupino-Stare, Rupino-Pokrzywnica (now Rupin), Gołembie, Ogonowo or Zagnanowo (now Ogony), Grzymały-Młynarze, Ochenki-Stare, Ochenki-Nowe (now Ochenki), Modzele, Śledzie, Długołęka, Chojnowo, Koski, Rogale, and Chrzczonki-Miłuny. On the left bank of the Narew, the noble villages included Chełsty, Nogawki-Mierzejewo, Cisk, Damięty, Korczaki-Klenczany, Grabowo, Bobin, Struniawy, Mierzejewo, Jawory, Gierwaty-Szeligi, Gierwaty-Stare, Gierwaty-Zarzeczne, Daniłowo, and Zalesie. Altogether, there were 25 noble villages, home to approximately 700 residents.

== History ==
The Sieluń Estate became the property of the provosts in the 13th century. Over time, the prerogatives of the Płock parsons grew increasingly expansive. They gained the right to appoint officials – wójts and Schultheiß – and to grant estates or convert villages to German law. The parsons themselves adopted the title praepositus magnus ("great provost"). The parson's subjects were exempt from most services and tributes, which encouraged small gentry to voluntarily submit to his authority. This process accelerated during the tenure of Henry, son of Duke Siemowit III of Mazovia, a member of the ruling dynasty.

In Sieluń itself, a fortified settlement emerged in the early 15th century, which soon gained prominence as the region's capital. From that point onward, all grants and orders regarding the Sieluń Estate were issued there, rather than from Płock as before. A land court was also established in Sieluń to resolve disputes among the local gentry. In 1510, the parsons began referring to the Sieluń Estate as a "territory" (territorium), effectively distinguishing them from the Łomża and Różan lands. Nine years later, a castle court was established, headed by a starosta appointed by the parson. Consequently, the provosts assumed full judicial authority over the Sieluń gentry, even ruling on cases involving high justice. Appeals against the castle court's decisions could only be made directly to the provost. Following Mazovia's incorporation into the Polish Crown, the position of the Sieluń gentry became unique. While Polish nobility enjoyed increasing freedoms, the Sieluń gentry remained under strict clerical control. A comparable situation existed only in the Duchy of Siewierz, owned by the Bishop of Kraków, though it was not formally part of the Commonwealth.

This marked the beginning of the Sieluń gentry's struggle to gain rights equal to those of the Polish nobility and to free themselves from clerical oversight. The first step in this process involved appealing to the Mazovian vicegerent, who supported the Sieluń gentry. In response, the Płock parson raided noble villages and confiscated documents proving their noble status – the only legal basis for seeking emancipation from ecclesiastical rule. In 1595, inspired by the parson, the Różan Land's nobility assembly excluded the Sieluń gentry from its ranks and denied their noble status. In 1598, Provost Andrzej Opaliński imposed the obligation of tithe payments on the Sieluń gentry and, for the first time, adopted the title of duke. However, his successors did not continue this practice. It was not until 1723 that Teodor Kazimierz Czartoryski, who held a princely title by birth, retained this title as the Sieluń provost – a tradition his successors upheld despite lacking legal grounds.

By the mid-18th century, the entire Sieluń gentry collectively sought to abolish ecclesiastical overlordship, reigniting the conflict. Until then, only individual nobles had attempted to prove their noble status. A series of legal battles and appeals to the Sejm culminated in the Great Sejm's resolution on 29 November 1791, which completely abolished clerical jurisdiction over the Sieluń gentry. Anticipating this outcome, Płock Provost Marcin Szeptycki voluntarily relinquished authority over the Sieluń gentry. The Duchy of Siewierz Duchy nobility faced a similar fate. Simultaneously, however, the same Sejm legitimized the title of "Duke of Sieluń", which the Płock cathedral parsons used until 1817.

The benefice estates held by the parsons were seized by the Prussian government after the partitions of Poland. They were later granted to Michel Ney during the Duchy of Warsaw era and ultimately fell under the control of Congress Poland government.

== Bibliography ==
- Smoleński, Władysław (1878). Mazowiecka szlachta w poddaństwie proboszczów płockich [The Mazovian Nobility in Subjugation to the Parsons of Płock] (PDF) (in Polish). Warsaw: WARSZAWA.
