= Church of the Exaltation of the Holy Cross, Goworowo =

Church of the Exaltation of the Holy Cross
- Kościół Podwyższenia Krzyża Świętego
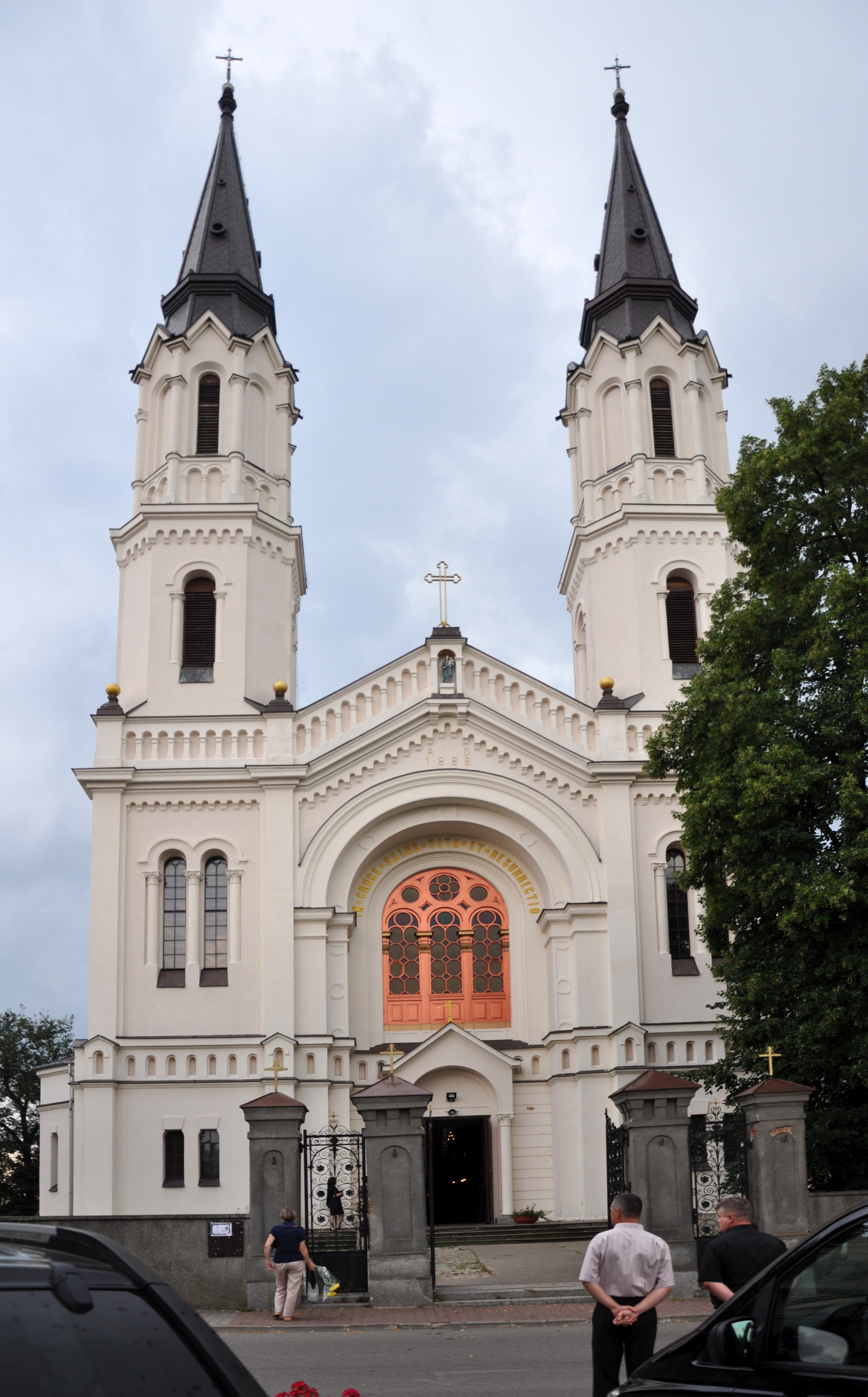
- Front view
- Church of the Exaltation of the Holy Cross
- 52°54′03″N 21°33′38.6″E
- Location: Goworowo
- Address: Kościelna Street
- Country: Poland
- Denomination: Roman Catholic
- Churchmanship: Latin Church

History
- Status: Parish church
- Founded: 1317
- Dedication: Exaltation of the Holy Cross
- Consecrated: 12 June 1887

Architecture
- Architect: Feliks Nowicki
- Style: Neo-Romanesque with Neo-Gothic elements
- Years built: 1880–1887

Specifications
- Materials: Brick

Administration
- Diocese: Roman Catholic Diocese of Łomża
- Deanery: Różan
- Parish: Parish of the Exaltation of the Holy Cross in Goworowo

The Church of the Exaltation of the Holy Cross (Polish: Kościół Podwyższenia Krzyża Świętego) is a Roman Catholic parish church in Goworowo, Poland. It belongs to the Różan Deanery of the Roman Catholic Diocese of Łomża and serves as the main church of the Parish of the Exaltation of the Holy Cross.

== Former churches in Goworowo ==
=== First church ===
In the 13th century, Goworowo became part of the estates of the provost of Płock Cathedral, the so-called Sieluń Principality. One of them, later Bishop of Płock Florian of Kościelec, erected a parish in Goworowo in 1317 as the first parish in what is now Ostrołęka County.

At that time, the first church was also built, initially dedicated to the Finding of the Holy Cross. In a later period, the dedication was changed to the Exaltation of the Holy Cross. In 1556, an altar dedicated to Saint Anne was established in the church. In 1665, an altar of the Guardian Angels was founded. In 1609, the church was mentioned as old and in need of major renovation.

=== Second church ===
On 11 November 1693, a new wooden church was consecrated in Goworowo by Bishop of Płock Andrzej Chryzostom Załuski. According to an inventory from 1763, the church was 29.5 metres long and 15 metres wide. It was covered with shingles and crowned with a small dome and a roof turret.

In 1695, a masonry chapel of Saint Francis was added, funded by Marianna Brzezińska née Radzimińska, widow of the wojski of Nur, Florian Brzeziński. The chapel had a pentagonal closure and a rib vault. Franciszek Maksymilian Sobieszczański described the chapel in the Orgelbrand's Universal Encyclopedia as architecturally unremarkable but praised the craftsmanship and antiquity of its altar:

The columns of this altar, twisted from two separate cylinders leaving empty spaces between them and interwoven with plant branches, are as remarkable in concept as they are skilful in execution. Above them, on one side, a figure of Adam under a tree, and on the other, Eve beneath a similar tree. On the sides of these columns stand figures of Jesus Christ and Saint Florian.

— Franciszek Maksymilian Sobieszczański, Encyklopedia Orgelbranda, vol. X

At the top of the altar was a depiction of the Immaculate Conception, while the central part showed scenes from the life of Saint Francis.

On 7 December 1695, Karol Zieliński, podstoli of Różan, son of the castellan of Sierpc Ludwik Zieliński, together with his wife Anna Suchcicka, daughter of Polichron Suchcicki, the huntmaster of Łomża, founded the Altar of the Most Holy Rosary. In 1711, Seweryn Skłodowski, heir of Rząśnik and Ponikiew Duża, ordered to be buried under the threshold of the main church door, where, as he stated in his will, the altar of his ancestors stood. According to Sobieszczański, at the entrance to the church lay a cracked stone slab bearing a faint relief of a knight leaning on a sword, next to whom knelt a young man with hands folded in prayer, most likely referring to Skłodowski's tombstone.

According to the 1763 inventory, the main altar contained a Crucifixion painting, with Saint Cunegund beneath it. The church had six side altars: of the Rosary, the Assumption of Mary, the Guardian Angels, Saint Anthony, the Holy Cross, and Saint Anne. The church was dismantled in early 1777. During the construction of the new church, services were held in the Chapel of Saint Francis.

=== Third church ===
The third church, still wooden and thatched, was completed in 1780. It was consecrated only on 20 June 1830 by Auxiliary Bishop of Płock Wawrzyniec Gutowski. The church measured 28 metres in length, 15 metres in width, and 9.2 metres in height. It was built so that the Chapel of Saint Francis was located behind the presbytery.

In the main altar there was an image of the Sacred Heart of Jesus, while the side altars were dedicated to the Exaltation of the Holy Cross and the Holy Rosary, as recorded during the deanery visitation of 1852. In 1872, a masonry bell tower was erected next to the church, which survives to this day.

On 17 June 1880, a fire broke out in the church caused by a left candle. The church burned down together with all its furnishings.

== Present church ==
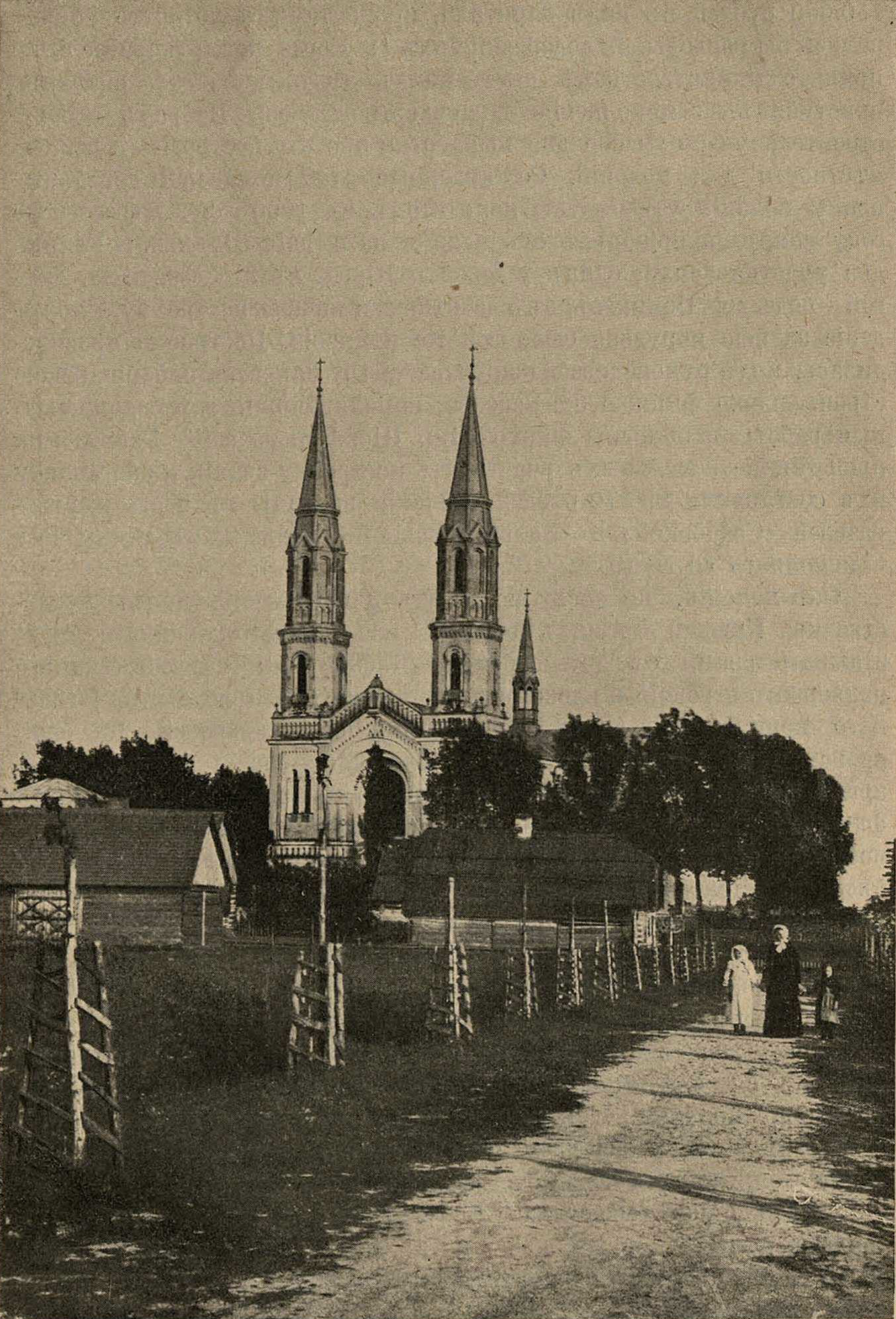
Church of the Exaltation of the Holy Cross in Goworowo (1904)

=== History of construction ===
Construction of the new church was financed through public donations. The main donors were parish priest Antoni Grodzki and landowner Mikołaj Zenon Glinka of Szczawin, who each donated 3,000 rubles.

A brickworks was established for the construction of the church. Funding was also provided by other local landowners, such as the Marchwicki family of Brzeźno and the Górski family of Ponikiew, as well as ordinary parishioners. A major role in both the construction and its financing was played by the subsequent parish priest and art historian Antoni Brykczyński, who devoted the income from his scholarly and religious publications to the building of the church.

The design was prepared by Feliks Nowicki, who designed a three-nave Neo-Romanesque church crowned with two Gothicising towers. The church was consecrated on 12 June 1887 by Auxiliary Bishop of Płock Henryk Piotr Kossowski.

=== Architecture and furnishings ===
The church contains six altars. The main altar of the Exaltation of the Holy Cross was completed in 1903. Earlier, in 1895, a side altar located next to the presbytery was created according to a design by Leandro Marconi. In the Glinka family chapel adjoining the church from the west stands an altar of Our Lady of Grace, completed in 1899 and made of black oak. The chapel also contains a bust and epitaph of one of the church's founders, Mikołaj Zenon Glinka of Szczawin. In the side naves there are three altars: Our Lady of Fatima (completed before World War I), Our Lady of Lourdes (1905–1916), and the Sacred Heart of Jesus (1907). The paintings placed in the side altars were painted by Wojciech Gerson.

The organ case, designed by the Warsaw firm L. Blomberg and Son and executed in 1890–1891, houses a 16-stop organ built in 1929 by Antoni Adolf Homan and Stanisław Jezierski. Among the furnishings is a reliquary containing a fragment of the True Cross, made during the construction of the church by Feliks Łopieński and donated together with the relic by Maria Lasocka, heiress of Czernie. Maria Lasocka also purchased for the church a painting by Józef Buchbinder depicting Saint Joseph with Jesus in the workshop.

The stained glass windows were produced at the Warsaw workshop of Saint Luke run by Maria Magdalena Łubieńska, as well as in the studio of Feliks Białkowski. The polychromy was executed by Władysław Drapiewski between 1930 and 1935. The Stations of the Cross and processional floats were made by Antoni Panasiuk.

== Bibliography ==
- Gołota, Janusz; Kijowski, Jerzy; Mironczuk, Jan (2018). Dzieje powiatu ostrołęckiego. Ostrołęka: Ostrołęckie Towarzystwo Naukowe im. Adama Chętnika.
