= Orz (river) =

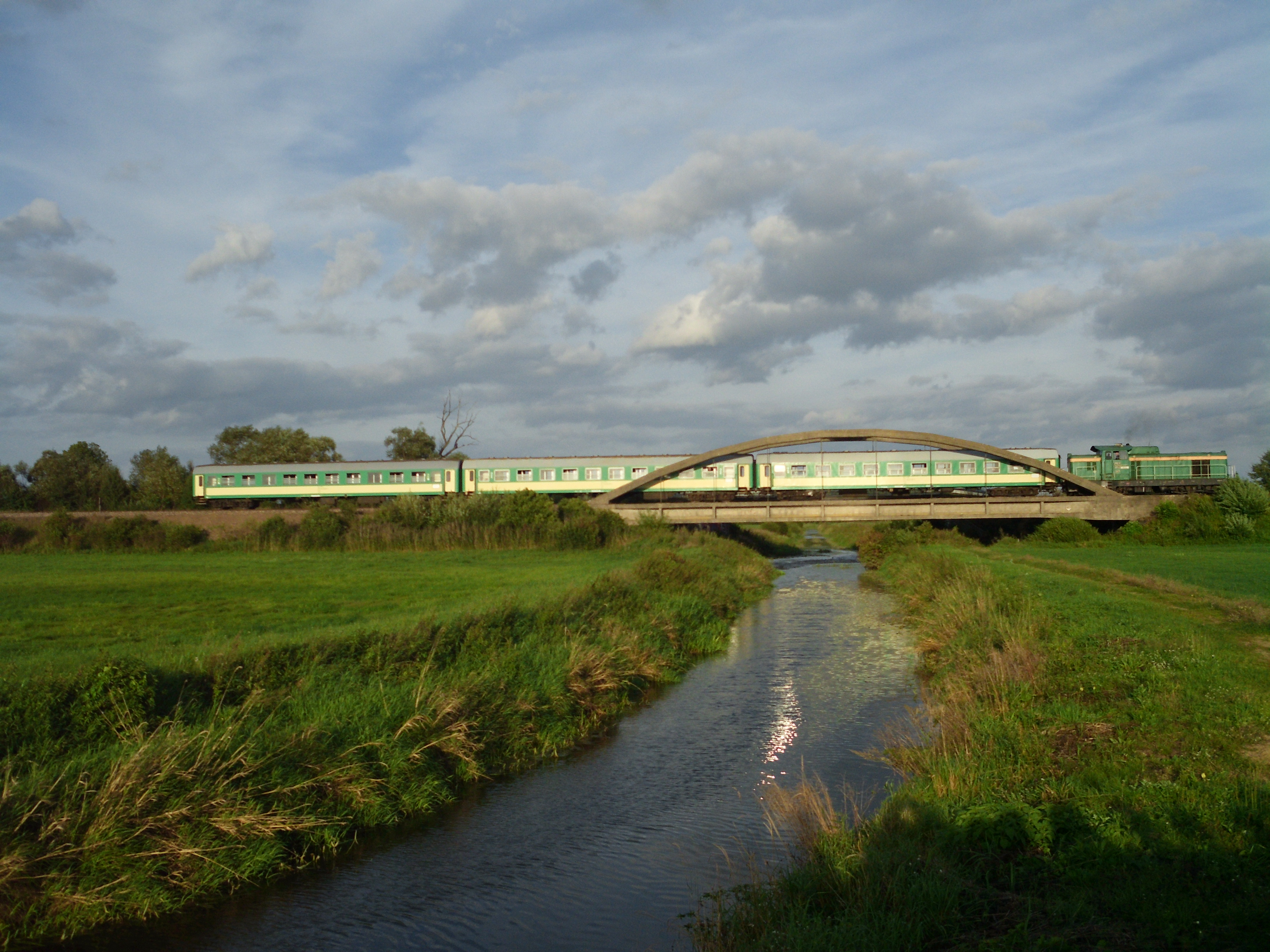

Location
- Country: Poland

Physical characteristics
- Source
  - location: south of Szumowo
- Mouth: Narew River
  - location: west of Szarłat
  - coordinates: 52°49′20″N 21°27′57″E
- Length: 60.6 km (37.7 mi)

Basin features
- Progression: Narew→ Vistula→ Baltic Sea

The Orz is a river in northeastern Poland, a left tributary of the Narew River, with a length of 63 km (39 mi) and a basin area of 607 km^{2} (234 sq mi).

The river flows in Podlaskie and Masovian voivodeships. It arises at the foot of Czerwony Bór, south of the village of Szumowo, flows through Międzyrzecze Łomżyńskie through the villages of Gumowo, Gniazdowo, Czerwin, Goworowo, Kunin, and Zaorze. It flows into the Narew River below Różan.
