= Władysław Glinka =

Polish writer (1864–1930)

Władysław Bonifacy Glinka
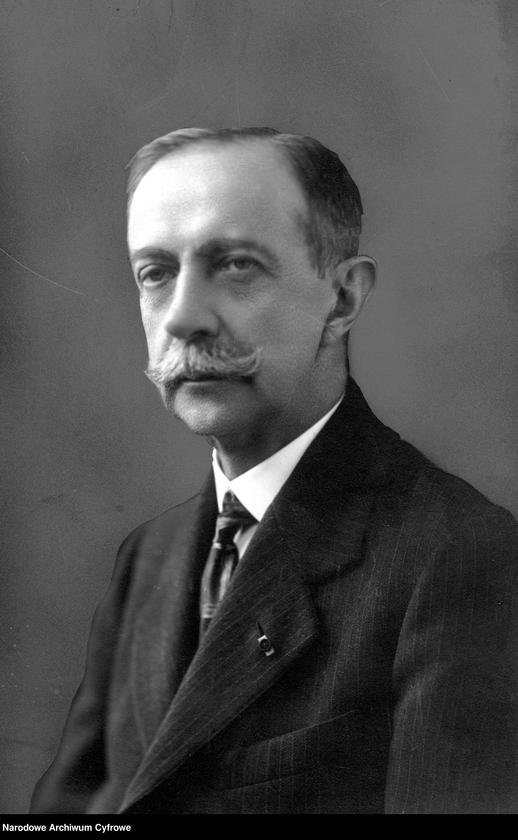
- Born: 1864; Szczawin, Congress Poland
- Died: 21 September 1930 (aged 65–66); Warsaw, Poland
- Resting place: Rzekuń
- Other name: Trzaska
- Occupations: Landowner, writer, social activist
- Political party: Real Politics Party
- Children: 3, including Jan
- Parent(s): Mikołaj Glinka and Maria Kosicka
- Relatives: Ludwik Kosicki

Władysław Bonifacy Glinka of Trzaska (1864 – 21 September 1930), also known by the pseudonym Trzaska, was a Polish activist and writer.

== Biography ==
=== Origins ===
He came from the landowning Glinka family, settled at the Szczawin estate near Ostrołęka. He was born in 1864 as the son of Mikołaj Zenon and Maria née Watta-Kosicka, daughter of Ludwik Kosicki, a historian, educator, and professor at St. Anne's Lyceum in Kraków. He had a sister, Jadwiga (1856–1938), and a brother, Antoni (died 1933).

=== Education ===
In 1881, he began his studies at the prestigious Lycée Louis-le-Grand in Paris, graduating in 1884 with first prize and a medal. He then pursued legal studies at the Sorbonne.

=== Social and economic activities ===
After returning to Poland, he settled in Stary Susk, an estate his father allocated to him from the family holdings in 1890. He transformed the local farm into one of the most modern in the region. His Brown Swiss cattle breeding operation was regarded as the best in the country, earning numerous awards at exhibitions in Warsaw, Kyiv, Moscow, and Saint Petersburg. He chaired a special cattle breeding commission of the Central Agricultural Society in Moscow. His breeding of English half-blood horses, intended for military use, was also of high quality. He contributed articles to the "Agricultural Gazette". In 1904, he founded one of the first. agricultural circles in the Kingdom of Poland. He led numerous other socio-economic organizations, including the District Agricultural Society, where he established a small credit fund for rural areas. Secret contributions for national education were collected under his name at the Commercial Bank in Warsaw.

=== Literary and journalistic activities ===
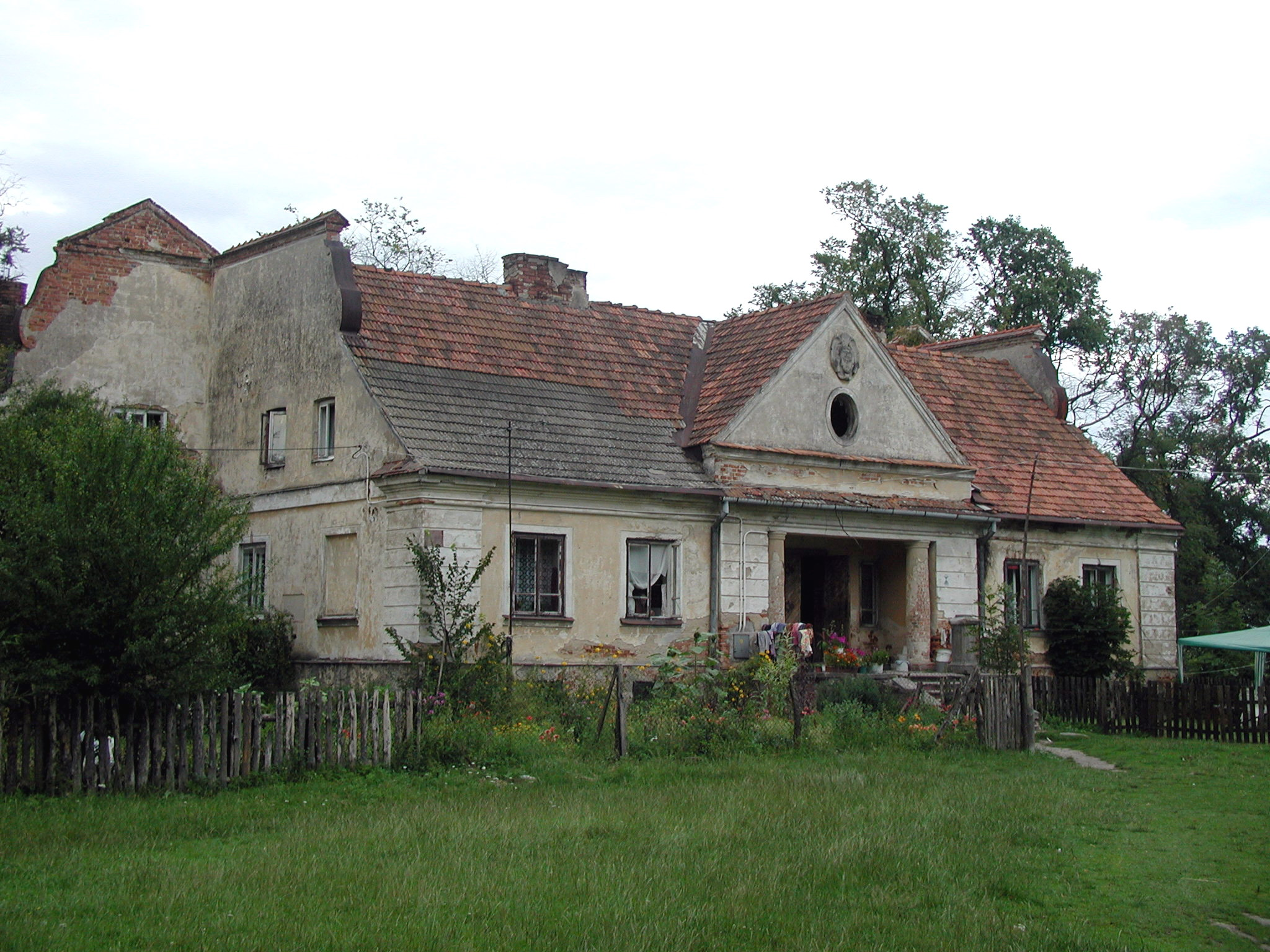
Manor house in Stary Susk, dating back to the late 18th century

At his manor in Stary Susk, he amassed a rich library of Polish, English, and French literature, totaling about 8,000 volumes. He studied the works of French philosophers such as Henri Bergson, Blaise Pascal, René Descartes, and Auguste Comte. He translated into Polish a work by Father Michel d'Herbigny and several encyclicals of Leo XIII. In addition to numerous journalistic articles, he wrote short stories collected in the volume Panna Żabińska, published in 1900 under the pseudonym "Trzaska". In 1928, he published Memoirs of the Great War, based on daily notes kept from the outbreak of the war until his return from exile in 1919.

=== Political activities ===
==== National-Democratic Party ====
Initially, he was involved with the National Movement, distributing the newspaper "Polak" and collaborating with "Głos". In 1905, he resigned from the National-Democratic Party., stating that "the idea had begun to distort".

After the outbreak of World War I, he founded and chaired the Ostrołęka Citizens' Committee., one of the first organizations in the Kingdom aimed at aiding war victims. He also participated in the Łomża Provincial Citizens' Committee. Following the retreat of the Russian front, he was deported into the interior of Russia in August 1915. During his journey, he established Citizens' Committees in Pruzhany, Slonim, and Minsk, where he resided for an extended period.

==== Real Politics Party ====
In 1917, while in exile in Moscow (where he settled with his family), he joined the Real Politics Party. In Moscow, he maintained contacts with the highest circles of Polish émigrés and established a political salon. He was active in the Central Citizens' Committee of the Kingdom of Poland in Russia, the Polish National Committee, the Council of Conventions, and the Polish Council of Interparty Unity. Within the latter, he chaired the Polish Society for Aid to War Victims.

==== Stay in Russia ====
Following the February Revolution of 1917, he organized an expedition of Józef Dowbor-Muśnicki’s legionnaires to Murmansk. After the October Revolution, he was imprisoned in July 1918, first at Lubyanka, then at Butyrka, and finally at Taganka. While in prison, he wrote a pamphlet titled Bolshevism and the Agrarian Question in Poland, outlining his views on land reform. After his release in November 1918, he returned to Poland.

==== In the Second Polish Republic ====
Władysław Glinka’s autograph in the Polish Declaration of Admiration and Friendship for the United States

His first act upon returning was organizing a County Committee in Ostrołęka. In 1919, he handed over his estate to his son Jan and moved to Warsaw, where he engaged in political activities. After the death of Zygmunt Wielopolski, he became a leader of the Real Politics Party and one of the editors of "Dziennik Powszechny," the party's mouthpiece. Following the merger of the Real Politics Party with other right-wing parties into the Constitutional Work Party (later renamed the National Right Party), he joined the new organization's Main Board. He was a key figure in the "coup" of former realists aimedHed to curb the influence, mainly of the Galician faction from the former National Democracy. On 14 September 1920, he left the party. After 1923, he withdrew from active political life, turning toward Christian-conservative currents. He maintained ties with prominent Polish politicians, including Władysław Grabski and Stanisław Wojciechowski. He wrote for "Czas" and "Przegląd Ziemiański," mainly on agricultural issues, and sharply criticized the May Coup in the press. In 1918, he founded the Land Credit Society in Warsaw, serving as its president until his death. He also chaired the Union of Long-Term Credit Institutions.

Władysław Glinka supported the incorporation of Belarusian lands into Poland, viewing Belarusians as a "barbaric population" unfit to be considered the "spiritual masters of the land" they inhabited, while Poles in the east too readily abandoned their role as "hosts and guides".

In ecclesiastical matters, he advocated for Ultramontanism.

=== Personal life ===
While in Paris, he met his future wife, Joanna de Calonne, the daughter of his lyceum professor. They married on 23 June 1889. They had three children: Jan (1890–1963), Magdalena (1893–1917), and Stefan (1900–1940).

=== Death and burial ===
He died of a heart attack on 21 September 1930 in Warsaw and was buried at the cemetery in Rzekuń near Ostrołęka.

== Orders and decorations ==
- Commander's Cross of the Order of Polonia Restituta (7 November 1925).
- Commander of the Legion of Honour (France).

== Publications ==
=== Books ===
- Panna Żabińska (Panna Żabińska, Breeding Farm in Kaczynów, Maligna, Antosia, Philosopher, Excerpt from Helena P.’s Diary), under the pseudonym "Trzaska" (Warsaw, 1901)
- Bolshevism and the Agrarian Question in Poland (Warsaw, 1918)
- Memoirs of the Great War (Warsaw, vol. I – 1927, vols. II-IV – 1928)

=== Selected articles ===
Published in: "Agricultural Gazette", "Głos", "Czas", "Landowners’ Review", "Warsaw Courier".
