= Kaczka =

Kaczka may refer to:

- Kaczka, Masovian Voivodeship
- IS-5 Kaczka a single-seat canard research glider
- Złota Kaczka ("Gold Duck"), a Polish award presented by the monthly magazine Film since 1956
- Złota kaczka ("Golden duck"), a legendary creature

== People with the surname ==
- Krzysztof Kaczka
- Guido Kaczka (born 1978), an Argentine television show host, actor and producer

== See also ==
- Kaczor
