= Oleksy =

Oleksy is a Polish-language surname, a regional spelling variant of the given name "Aleksy", or Alexius.

Notable people with this surname include:

- Józef Oleksy (1946–2015), Polish politician
  - Oleksy tapes
- Paweł Oleksy (born 1991), Polish football player
- Marcin Oleksy (born 1987), Polish amputee football player, 2022 FIFA Puskás Award winner
- Steven Oleksy (born 1986), American ice hockey player

== See also ==
- Strzemieczne-Oleksy, village in Masovian Voivodeship, Poland
- Oleksiy, Ukrainian given name
