= Cisk (disambiguation) =

Cisk is a brand of lager and pils style beers produced by Maltese brewery Simonds Farsons Cisk plc. The first 'Cisk' brands of beer were produced by the Malta Export Brewery (which later became known as Simonds Farsons Cisk) in 1929 and included 'Cisk Pilsener' and 'Cisk Munchener'.

Cisk may also refer to:

- CISK, an abbreviation for convective instability of the second kind
- Cisk, Poland
