= Rząśnik =

Rząśnik may refer to the following places in Poland:

- Rząśnik, Lower Silesian Voivodeship (south-west Poland)
- Rząśnik, Gmina Stary Lubotyń, Ostrów County in Masovian Voivodeship (east-central Poland)
- Rząśnik, Wyszków County in Masovian Voivodeship (east-central Poland)
