= Jurgi (disambiguation) =

Jurģi is an ancient Latvian festival.

Jurgi may also refer to the following villages in Poland:

- Jurgi, Masovian Voivodeship (east-central Poland)
- Jurgi, Warmian-Masurian Voivodeship (north Poland)
