= Żochowo =

Żochowo may refer to the following places:

- Żochowo, Gmina Stary Lubotyń, Ostrów County in Masovian Voivodeship (east-central Poland)
- Żochowo, Sierpc County in Masovian Voivodeship (east-central Poland)
- Żochowo, Pomeranian Voivodeship (north Poland)
