= Jadwiga Dudziec =

Polish educator and member of the Polish Resistance during World War II

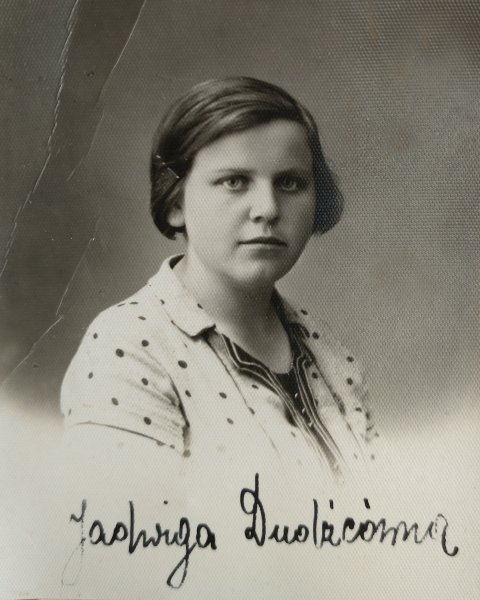
- Born: March 19, 1912; Jawory Stare, Congress Poland, Russian Empire
- Died: July 17, 1944 (aged 32); Vilnius, Soviet-occupied Lithuania
- Awards: Righteous Among the Nations (1999); Order of Polonia Restituta (2018); Life Saving Cross (2021)

Jadwiga Dudziec (born 19 March 1912 in Jawory Stare, died 17 July 1944 in Vilnius) was a Polish educator, scout activists, member of the Polish Resistance during World War II, engaged in rescue of Jews during the Holocaust. For her efforts she was awarded a title of the Righteous Among the Nations in 1999 by Yad Vashem.

== Biography ==
=== Before World War II ===
She was born in Jawory Stare in the Goworowo commune, Ostrołęka County into the family of farmer Stanisław Dudziec and Józefa née Osowiecka, as the youngest, tenth child. Her father died when she was two and a half years old. During World War I, the family fled to Ukraine, from where they returned after three years. In the Polish–Soviet War, one of her brothers was killed.

At the age of 14, she began her studies at the Private Teacher Training Seminary of the Sisters of the Resurrection in Żoliborz, Warsaw. In Warsaw, Jadwiga met Irena Adamowicz, a scout two years her senior who cooperated with Jewish scouting and encouraged her to join the scouting movement. In 1931, she obtained a diploma as a primary school teacher and then found work in Oszmiana, in the Wilno Voivodeship.

In 1934, Dudziec moved to Vilnius, where she came into contact with the Zionist Jewish scouting movement. At the same time, she began studies at the Faculty of Mathematics and Natural Sciences of Stefan Batory University. She was involved with the Catholic Academic Youth Association "Odrodzenie" and joined the senior scout group "Makrele" of the 13th Girl Scout Troop in Vilnius (the so-called "Black Thirteen").

As recalled years later by Maria Lenartowicz, chronicler of the 13th Vilnius Girl Scout Troop:

She lived in the cheapest dormitory, near the Bernardine Sisters’ convent on St. Anne Street, eating dinners for 30 groszy. For all those years always in the same little coat, often in worn-out cheap shoes. All the ‘Makrele’ remember Jadzia always smiling, full of kindness and goodwill towards people. This attitude was a consequence not only of her deeply understood scout life but above all of her strong faith.

In 1937 she attended a camp in Bujaków near Bielsko with a Jewish scout troop she was leading. And the following year in Józefów near Warsaw. In 1939, she graduated with a master's degree in philosophy (mathematics).

=== World War II ===
During the Soviet and German occupation of Vilnius, she did not reveal her education or profession. She frequently changed apartments. In the winter of 1941–42, in her apartment on Wiwulski Street, the Home Army conducted courses for girl scouts on weapon construction, combat methods, and first aid.

At that time, she worked in a clog factory as a workshop manager. She mainly employed Jews who were in hiding with documents provided by the Home Army. Thanks to this work, she was able to travel to Warsaw as well as outside Vilnius, establishing contacts and delivering weapons to Jewish partisan units. In Vilnius, she cooperated with Echiel Szejnbaum (Yechiel Sheinbaum), the leader of the Jewish Combat Organization in the city.

Shortly before the Soviet re-occupation in July 1944 during the Vilnius offensive, Dudziec was wounded by a bomb fragment, which led to the amputation of her leg. She never recovered from the operation and died in hospital. Jewish partisans from the Vilnius forests, including Abraham Sutzkewer and Rozhka Korczak, testified that she was a devout Catholic whose heroic deeds were inspired by unshakable religious faith.

Her friend Wala Sulimowicz recalled:

“She went to Jewish partisan units, carried weapons and documents to Warsaw. From one of those trips she brought back pages of Aleksander Kamiński’s Stones for the Rampart hidden in the bottom of a suitcase. I remember the excitement and emotion when we carefully pulled out this secret, powerful book.”

Another witness, Gabriela Kosińska, testified:

“Pinning on a yellow star, she entered the ghetto and led young Jewish women out to hide them in the countryside. She also rescued small children from extermination. If she could not place a child with someone in the village, she knocked at the convent of the Sisters of Charity on Subocz Street, who ran an orphanage, and she was never refused.”

She also acted as a liaison between the Roman Catholic Archdiocese of Vilnius and ghettos in the Vilnius region, and was connected with the Home Army.

=== Legacy ===
Jadwiga Dudziec is buried at New Rasos Cemetery in Vilnius (sector 10, no. 429).

After the war, her elder sister Zofia searched for her through the Polish Red Cross, but without success. Only in the summer of 1948 was it confirmed that she had died.

On 17 June 1999, the Yad Vashem Institute honored her with the title of Righteous Among the Nations. She remains the only resident of Ostrołęka County to receive this distinction. In 2016, the Goworowo commune erected a memorial plaque in her honor, and in the same year, the restored tombstone at New Rossa Cemetery was rededicated thanks to the efforts of the Embassy of Poland in Vilnius.

On 20 December 2018, the President of Poland Andrzej Duda posthumously awarded her the Commander's Cross of the Order of Polonia Restituta. The ceremony took place on 25 March 2019, during the second anniversary of the National Day of Remembrance of Poles who saved Jews under German occupation.

In 2021, Lithuanian President Gitanas Nausėda posthumously awarded Jadwiga Dudziec the Life Saving Cross.
