= IS5 =

IS5 or IS-5 may refer to:

- is 5, a 1926 collection of poetry by E. E. Cummings
- IS-8, the Soviet T-10 tank
- Infosec Standard 5, a British IT security standard
- IS-5 Kaczka, a Polish canard research glider

== See also ==
- IS-54, a second-generation mobile phone system
