= Orz =

Orz, orz, or ORZ may refer to:

- Orz (emoticon), an emoticon representing a kneeling or bowing person
- Orz (river), a river in Poland
- Ormu language of Papua (ISO 639-3 code)
- Orange Walk Airport, Belize (IATA code)

== See also ==
- OCZ, a brand of solid-state drives
