= Kołaki =

Kołaki may refer to the following places:

- Kołaki, Masovian Voivodeship (east-central Poland)
- Kołaki, Podlaskie Voivodeship (north-east Poland)
- Kołaki, Warmian-Masurian Voivodeship (north Poland)
