= Gmina Młynarze =

Gmina Młynarze Młynarze Commune
- Gmina
- Flag Coat of arms

- Location within Poland
- Coordinates (Młynarze): 52°58′N 21°26′E
- Country: Poland
- Voivodeship: Masovian
- County: Maków
- Seat: Młynarze

Area
  - Total: 75.04 km^{2} (28.97 sq mi)

Population (2011)
  - Total: 1,766
  - Density: 23.53/km^{2} (60.95/sq mi)

Gmina Młynarze is a rural gmina (administrative district) in Maków County, Masovian Voivodeship, in east-central Poland. Its seat is the village of Młynarze, which lies approximately 23 kilometres (14 mi) north-east of Maków Mazowiecki and 85 km (52 mi) north-east of Warsaw.

The gmina covers an area of 75.04 square kilometres (29.0 sq mi), and as of 2006 its total population is 1,747 (1,766 in 2011).

== Villages ==
Gmina Młynarze contains the villages and settlements of Długołęka Wielka, Długołęka-Koski, Gierwaty, Głażewo-Cholewy, Głażewo-Święszki, Kołaki, Młynarze, Modzele, Ochenki, Ogony, Rupin, Sadykierz, Sieluń, Strzemieczne-Hieronimy, Strzemieczne-Oleksy, Strzemieczne-Wiosny and Załęże-Ponikiewka.

== Neighbouring gminas ==
Gmina Młynarze is bordered by the gminas of Czerwonka, Goworowo, Olszewo-Borki, Różan, Rzekuń and Sypniewo.
