= Kobylin, Ostrołęka County =

Kobylin
- Village
- Location within Poland
- Coordinates: 52°49′50″N 21°33′04″E
- Country: Poland
- Voivodeship: Masovian
- County: Ostrołęka
- Gmina: Goworowo

Kobylin [kɔˈbɨlin] is a village in the administrative district of Gmina Goworowo, within Ostrołęka County, Masovian Voivodeship, in east-central Poland.
