= Długołęka Wielka =

- Village
- Location within Poland
- Coordinates: 52°58′N 21°23′E
- Country: Poland
- Voivodeship: Masovian
- County: Maków
- Gmina: Młynarze

Długołęka Wielka (Polish pronunciation: [dwuɡɔˈwɛŋka ˈvjɛlka]) is a village in the administrative district of Gmina Młynarze, within Maków County, Masovian Voivodeship, in east-central Poland.
