= Gmina Goworowo =

Gmina Goworowo Goworowo Commune
- Gmina
- Flag Coat of arms

- Location within Poland
- Coordinates (Goworowo): 52°54′2″N 21°33′16″E
- Country: Poland
- Voivodeship: Masovian
- County: Ostrołęka County
- Seat: Goworowo

Area
  - Total: 218.93 km^{2} (84.53 sq mi)

Population (2011)
  - Total: 8,689
  - Density: 39.69/km^{2} (102.8/sq mi)
- Website: www.goworowo.pl

Gmina Goworowo is a rural gmina (administrative district) in Ostrołęka County, Masovian Voivodeship, in east-central Poland. Its seat is the village of Goworowo, which lies approximately 19 kilometres (12 mi) south of Ostrołęka and 85 km (53 mi) north-east of Warsaw.

The gmina covers an area of 218.93 square kilometres (84.5 sq mi), and as of 2006 its total population is 8,756 (8,689 in 2011).

== Villages ==
Gmina Goworowo contains the villages and settlements of Borki, Brzeźno, Brzeźno-Kolonia, Cisk, Czarnowo, Czernie, Damięty, Daniłowo, Dzbądzek, Gierwaty, Góry, Goworówek, Goworowo, Grabowo, Grodzisk, Jawory-Podmaście, Jawory-Wielkopole, Jemieliste, Józefowo, Jurgi, Kaczka, Kobylin, Kruszewo, Kunin, Lipianka, Ludwinowo, Michałowo, Nogawki, Pasieki, Pokrzywnica, Pokrzywnica-Kolonia, Ponikiew Duża, Ponikiew Mała, Ponikiew Mała-Kolonia, Rębisze-Działy, Rębisze-Kolonia, Rębisze-Parcele, Stare Jawory, Struniawy, Szarłat, Szczawin, Wólka Brzezińska, Wólka Kunińska, Żabin and Zaorze.

== Neighbouring gminas ==
Gmina Goworowo is bordered by the gminas of Czerwin, Długosiodło, Młynarze, Różan, Rzekuń, Rzewnie and Wąsewo.
