= Stary Lubotyń =

- Village
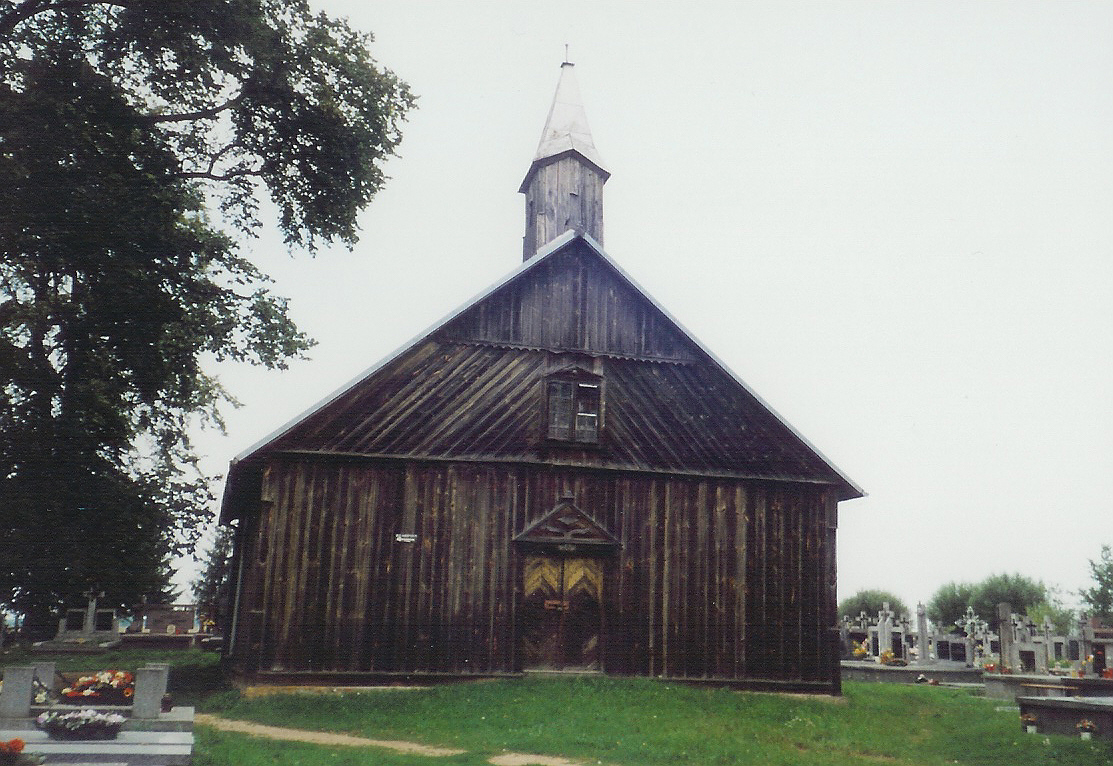

- Location within Poland
- Coordinates: 52°56′N 21°56′E
- Country: Poland
- Voivodeship: Masovian
- County: Ostrów
- Gmina: Stary Lubotyń
- Time zone: UTC+1 (CET)
  - Summer (DST): UTC+2 (CEST)
- Postal code: 07-303
- Vehicle registration: WOR
- Website: http://www.lubotyn.pl

Stary Lubotyń [ˈstarɨ luˈbɔtɨɲ] is a village in Ostrów County, Masovian Voivodeship, in east-central Poland. It is the seat of the gmina (administrative district) called Gmina Stary Lubotyń.

== History ==
The local Catholic church was established in 1497. Lubotyń was a private church village of the Diocese of Płock, administratively located in the Masovian Voivodeship in the Greater Poland Province of the Kingdom of Poland. In 1827, it had a population of 195.

During the German occupation of Poland (World War II), on 23 January 1943, the German gendarmerie committed a massacre of eight young Poles, who were caught at a dance party (see also Nazi crimes against the Polish nation).
