= Głażewo-Cholewy =

- Village
- Location within Poland
- Coordinates: 52°57′11″N 21°20′38″E
- Country: Poland
- Voivodeship: Masovian
- County: Maków
- Gmina: Młynarze

Głażewo-Cholewy [ɡwaˈʐɛvɔ xɔˈlɛvɨ] is a village in the administrative district of Gmina Młynarze, within Maków County, Masovian Voivodeship, in east-central Poland.
