= Głażewo-Święszki =

- Village
- Location within Poland
- Coordinates: 52°57′N 21°19′E
- Country: Poland
- Voivodeship: Masovian
- County: Maków
- Gmina: Młynarze

Głażewo-Święszki (Polish pronunciation: [ɡwaˈʐɛvɔ ˈɕfjɛ̃ʂkʲi]) is a village in the administrative district of Gmina Młynarze, within Maków County, Masovian Voivodeship, in east-central Poland.
