= Jawory-Podmaście =

Village in Gmina Goworowo, Poland

- Village
- Location within Poland
- Coordinates: 52°56′04″N 21°31′11″E
- Country: Poland
- Voivodeship: Masovian
- County: Ostrołęka
- Gmina: Goworowo

Jawory-Podmaście [jaˈvɔrɨ pɔdˈmaɕt͡ɕɛ] is a village in the administrative district of Gmina Goworowo, in Ostrołęka County, Masovian Voivodeship, in east-central Poland.
