= Ludwinowo, Ostrołęka County =

Ludwinowo
- Village
- Location within Poland
- Coordinates: 52°54′30″N 21°30′15″E
- Country: Poland
- Voivodeship: Masovian
- County: Ostrołęka
- Gmina: Goworowo

Ludwinowo [ludviˈnɔvɔ] is a village in the administrative district of Gmina Goworowo, within Ostrołęka County, Masovian Voivodeship, in east-central Poland.
