= Budziszki =

- Village
- Location within Poland
- Coordinates: 52°57′N 21°54′E
- Country: Poland
- Voivodeship: Masovian
- County: Ostrów
- Gmina: Stary Lubotyń
- Population: 126

Budziszki [buˈd͡ʑiʂki] is a village in the administrative district of Gmina Stary Lubotyń, within Ostrów County, Masovian Voivodeship, in east-central Poland.
