= Strzemieczne-Wiosny =

- Village
- Location within Poland
- Coordinates: 52°59′38″N 21°24′58″E
- Country: Poland
- Voivodeship: Masovian
- County: Maków
- Gmina: Młynarze

Strzemieczne-Wiosny [stʂɛˈmjɛt͡ʂnɛ ˈvjɔsnɨ] is a village in the administrative district of Gmina Młynarze, within Maków County, Masovian Voivodeship, in east-central Poland.
