= Rabędy, Gmina Stary Lubotyń =

Village in Gmina Stary Lubotyń, Poland

Rabędy
- Village
- Location within Poland
- Coordinates: 52°53′04″N 21°56′16″E
- Country: Poland
- Voivodeship: Masovian
- County: Ostrów
- Gmina: Stary Lubotyń

Rabędy [raˈbɛndɨ] is a village in the administrative district of Gmina Stary Lubotyń, within Ostrów County, Masovian Voivodeship, in east-central Poland.
