= Dzbądzek =

- Village
- Location within Poland
- Coordinates: 52°50′54″N 21°27′29″E
- Country: Poland
- Voivodeship: Masovian
- County: Ostrołęka
- Gmina: Goworowo

Dzbądzek [ˈd͡zbɔnd͡zɛk] is a village in the administrative district of Gmina Goworowo, within Ostrołęka County, Masovian Voivodeship, in east-central Poland.
