= Brzeźno-Kolonia =

Village in Gmina Goworowo, Poland

- Village
- Location within Poland
- Coordinates: 52°54′56″N 21°38′17″E
- Country: Poland
- Voivodeship: Masovian
- County: Ostrołęka
- Gmina: Goworowo

Brzeźno-Kolonia [ˈbʐɛʑnɔ kɔˈlɔɲa] is a village in the administrative district of Gmina Goworowo, within Ostrołęka County, Masovian Voivodeship, in east-central Poland.
