= Czernie =

- Village
- Location within Poland
- Coordinates: 52°52′48″N 21°36′25″E
- Country: Poland
- Voivodeship: Masovian
- County: Ostrołęka
- Gmina: Goworowo

Czernie [ˈt͡ʂɛrɲɛ] is a village in the administrative district of Gmina Goworowo, within Ostrołęka County, Masovian Voivodeship, in east-central Poland.
