= Sulęcin Włościański =

- Village
- Location within Poland
- Coordinates: 52°53′34″N 21°51′53″E
- Country: Poland
- Voivodeship: Masovian
- County: Ostrów
- Gmina: Stary Lubotyń
- Population: 355 people (as of 2,010−10−16)

Sulęcin Włościański (Polish pronunciation: [suˈlɛɲtɕin vwɔɕˈtɕaj̃skʲi]) is a village in the administrative district of Gmina Stary Lubotyń, within Ostrów County, Masovian Voivodeship, in east-central Poland.
