= Michałowo, Gmina Goworowo =

Michałowo
- Village
- Location within Poland
- Coordinates: 52°49′09″N 21°29′51″E
- Country: Poland
- Voivodeship: Masovian
- County: Ostrołęka
- Gmina: Goworowo

Michałowo [mixaˈwɔvɔ] is a village in the administrative district of Gmina Goworowo, within Ostrołęka County, Masovian Voivodeship, in east-central Poland.
