= Góry, Ostrołęka County =

Góry
- Village
- Location within Poland
- Coordinates: 52°49′30″N 21°34′39″E
- Country: Poland
- Voivodeship: Masovian
- County: Ostrołęka
- Gmina: Goworowo
- Population: 160

Góry [ˈɡurɨ] is a village in the administrative district of Gmina Goworowo, within Ostrołęka County, Masovian Voivodeship, in east-central Poland.
