= Załęże-Ponikiewka =

- Village
- Location within Poland
- Coordinates: 52°56′49″N 21°18′16″E
- Country: Poland
- Voivodeship: Masovian
- County: Maków
- Gmina: Młynarze

Załęże-Ponikiewka [zaˈwɛ̃ʐɛ pɔniˈkʲɛfka] is a village in the administrative district of Gmina Młynarze, within Maków County, Masovian Voivodeship, in east-central Poland.
