= Kruszewo, Ostrołęka County =

Kruszewo
- Village
- Location within Poland
- Coordinates: 52°55′53″N 21°29′17″E
- Country: Poland
- Voivodeship: Masovian
- County: Ostrołęka
- Gmina: Goworowo

Kruszewo [kruˈʂɛvɔ] is a village in the administrative district of Gmina Goworowo, within Ostrołęka County, Masovian Voivodeship, in east-central Poland.
