= Żyłowo =

- Village
- Location within Poland
- Coordinates: 52°53′21″N 21°56′36″E
- Country: Poland
- Voivodeship: Masovian
- County: Ostrów
- Gmina: Stary Lubotyń
- Population: 98

Żyłowo [ʐɨˈwɔvɔ] is a village in the administrative district of Gmina Stary Lubotyń, within Ostrów County, Masovian Voivodeship, in east-central Poland.
