= Chmielewo, Gmina Stary Lubotyń =

Chmielewo
- Village
- Location within Poland
- Coordinates: 52°54′52″N 21°56′11″E
- Country: Poland
- Voivodeship: Masovian
- County: Ostrów
- Gmina: Stary Lubotyń

Chmielewo [xmjɛˈlɛvɔ] is a village in the administrative district of Gmina Stary Lubotyń, within Ostrów County, Masovian Voivodeship, in east-central Poland.
