= Rogówek, Masovian Voivodeship =

Rogówek
- Village
- Location within Poland
- Coordinates: 52°56′29″N 21°50′30″E
- Country: Poland
- Voivodeship: Masovian
- County: Ostrów
- Gmina: Stary Lubotyń

Rogówek [rɔˈɡuvɛk] is a village in the administrative district of Gmina Stary Lubotyń, within Ostrów County, Masovian Voivodeship, in east-central Poland.
