= Świerże, Masovian Voivodeship =

Świerże
- Village
- Location within Poland
- Coordinates: 52°46′N 22°10′E
- Country: Poland
- Voivodeship: Masovian
- County: Ostrów Mazowiecka
- Gmina: Stary Lubotyń

Świerże (Polish pronunciation: [ˈɕfjɛrʐɛ]) is a village in the administrative district of Gmina Stary Lubotyń, within Ostrów County, Masovian Voivodeship, in east-central Poland.
