= Podbiele, Masovian Voivodeship =

Podbiele
- Village
- Location within Poland
- Coordinates: 52°54′N 21°58′E
- Country: Poland
- Voivodeship: Masovian
- County: Ostrów
- Gmina: Stary Lubotyń

Podbiele [pɔdˈbjɛlɛ] is a village in the administrative district of Gmina Stary Lubotyń, within Ostrów County, Masovian Voivodeship, in east-central Poland.
