= Gmina Stary Lubotyń =

Gmina Stary Lubotyń Stary Lubotyń Commune
- Gmina
- Flag Coat of arms
- Interactive map of Gmina Stary Lubotyń
- Coordinates (Stary Lubotyń): 52°56′N 21°56′E
- Country: Poland
- Voivodeship: Masovian
- County: Ostrów
- Seat: Stary Lubotyń

Area
  - Total: 109.16 km^{2} (42.15 sq mi)

Population (2013)
  - Total: 3,857
  - Density: 35.33/km^{2} (91.51/sq mi)
- Website: https://www.lubotyn.pl

Gmina Stary Lubotyń is a rural gmina (administrative district) in Ostrów County, Masovian Voivodeship, in east-central Poland. Its seat is the village of Stary Lubotyń, which lies approximately 15 kilometres (9 mi) north-east of Ostrów Mazowiecka and 100 km (62 mi) north-east of Warsaw.

The gmina covers an area of 109.16 square kilometres (42.1 sq mi), and as of 2006 its total population is 3,984 (3,857 in 2013).

== Villages ==
Gmina Stary Lubotyń contains the villages and settlements of Budziszki, Chmielewo, Gawki, Gniazdowo, Grądziki, Gumowo, Klimonty, Kosewo, Koskowo, Lubotyń-Kolonia, Lubotyń-Morgi, Lubotyń-Włóki, Podbiele, Podbielko, Rabędy, Rogówek, Rogowo-Folwark, Rząśnik, Stare Rogowo, Stary Lubotyń, Stary Turobin, Sulęcin Szlachecki, Sulęcin Włościański, Świerże, Turobin-Brzozowa, Żochowo and Żyłowo.

== Neighbouring gminas ==
Gmina Stary Lubotyń is bordered by the gminas of Czerwin, Ostrów Mazowiecka, Śniadowo and Szumowo.
