= Ponikiew Mała-Kolonia =

- Village
- Location within Poland
- Coordinates: 52°52′25″N 21°34′50″E
- Country: Poland
- Voivodeship: Masovian
- County: Ostrołęka
- Gmina: Goworowo

Ponikiew Mała-Kolonia [pɔˈnikjɛf ˈmawa kɔˈlɔɲa] is a village in the administrative district of Gmina Goworowo, within Ostrołęka County, Masovian Voivodeship, in east-central Poland.
