= Czarnowo, Ostrołęka County =

Czarnowo
- Village
- Location within Poland
- Coordinates: 52°52′43″N 21°31′48″E
- Country: Poland
- Voivodeship: Masovian
- County: Ostrołęka
- Gmina: Goworowo

Czarnowo [t͡ʂarˈnɔvɔ] is a village in the administrative district of Gmina Goworowo, within Ostrołęka County, Masovian Voivodeship, in east-central Poland.
