= Gierwaty, Maków County =

Maków County village

Gierwaty
- Village
- Location within Poland
- Coordinates: 52°58′23″N 21°24′31″E
- Country: Poland
- Voivodeship: Masovian
- County: Maków
- Gmina: Młynarze

Gierwaty [ɡʲɛrˈvatɨ] is a village in the administrative district of Gmina Młynarze, within Maków County, Masovian Voivodeship, in east-central Poland.
