= Lubotyń-Morgi =

Village in Gmina Stary Lubotyń, Poland

- Village
- Location within Poland
- Coordinates: 52°56′45″N 21°55′56″E
- Country: Poland
- Voivodeship: Masovian
- County: Ostrów
- Gmina: Stary Lubotyń

Lubotyń-Morgi [luˈbɔtɨɲ ˈmɔrɡi] is a village in the administrative district of Gmina Stary Lubotyń, within Ostrów County, Masovian Voivodeship, in east-central Poland.
