= Podbielko =

- Village
- Location within Poland
- Coordinates: 52°55′N 21°59′E
- Country: Poland
- Voivodeship: Masovian
- County: Ostrów
- Gmina: Stary Lubotyń

Podbielko [pɔdˈbjɛlkɔ] is a village in the administrative district of Gmina Stary Lubotyń, within Ostrów County, Masovian Voivodeship, in east-central Poland.
