= Grodzisk, Ostrołęka County =

Grodzisk
- Village
- Location within Poland
- Coordinates: 52°53′35″N 21°33′3″E
- Country: Poland
- Voivodeship: Masovian
- County: Ostrołęka
- Gmina: Goworowo

Grodzisk [ˈɡrɔd͡ʑisk] is a village in the administrative district of Gmina Goworowo, within Ostrołęka County, Masovian Voivodeship, in east-central Poland.
