= Stare Rogowo =

- Village
- Location within Poland
- Coordinates: 52°56′02″N 21°52′33″E
- Country: Poland
- Voivodeship: Masovian
- County: Ostrów
- Gmina: Stary Lubotyń
- Time zone: UTC+1 (CET)
  - Summer (DST): UTC+2 (CEST)
- Postal code: 07-303
- Vehicle registration: WOR

Stare Rogowo [ˈstarɛ rɔˈɡɔvɔ] is a village in the administrative district of Gmina Stary Lubotyń, within Ostrów County, Masovian Voivodeship, in east-central Poland.

== History ==
Rogowo was a village of petty nobility. In 1827, it had a population of 138.

On 10 September 1939, during the German invasion of Poland at the start of World War II, German troops perpetrated a massacre of 21 Poles in Stare Rogowo (see also Nazi crimes against the Polish nation).
