= Długołęka-Koski =

- Village
- Location within Poland
- Coordinates: 52°58′03″N 21°22′15″E
- Country: Poland
- Voivodeship: Masovian
- County: Maków
- Gmina: Młynarze

Długołęka-Koski (Polish pronunciation: [dwuɡɔˈwɛŋka ˈkɔskʲi]) is a village in the administrative district of Gmina Młynarze, within Maków County, Masovian Voivodeship, in east-central Poland.

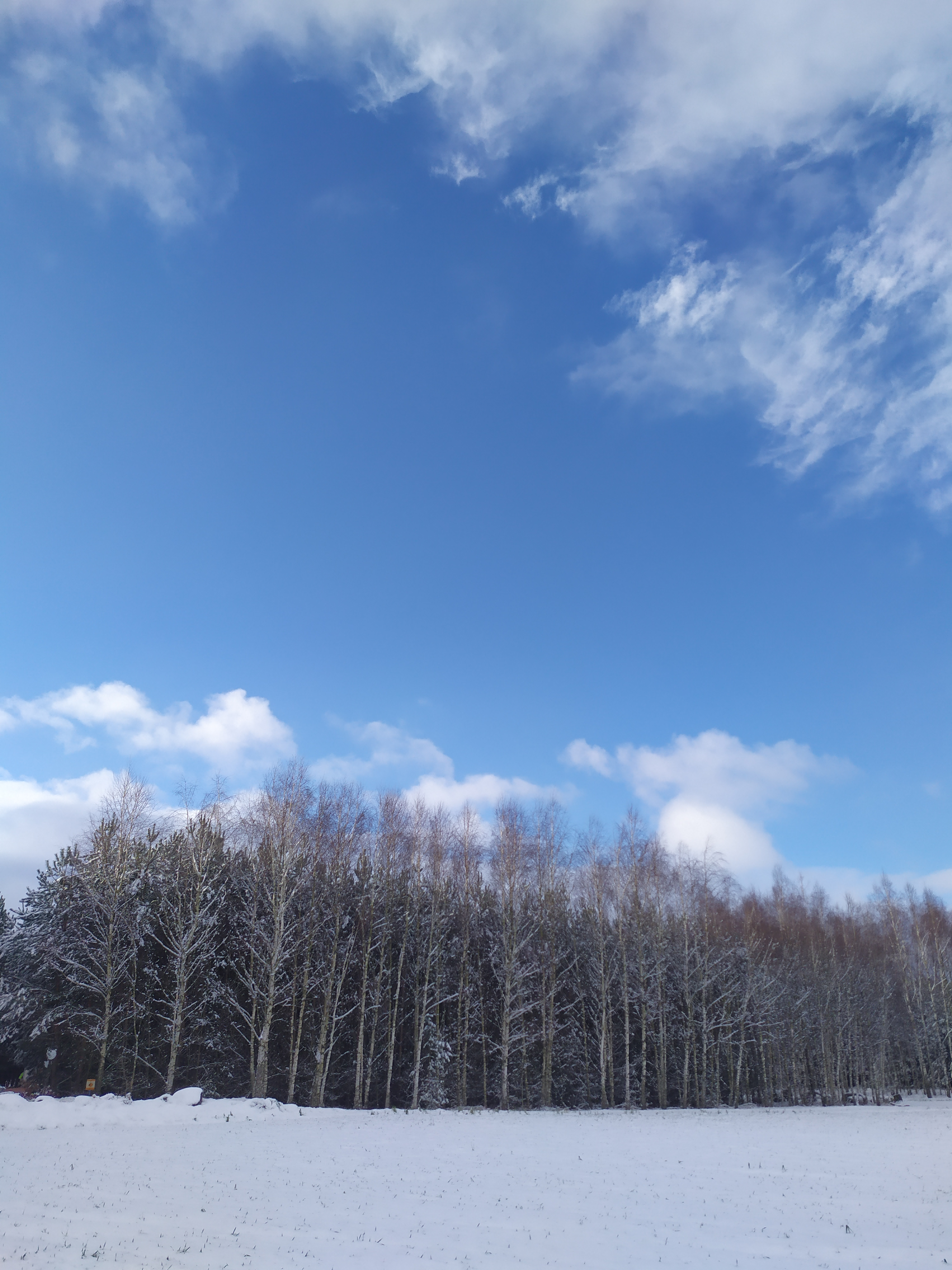

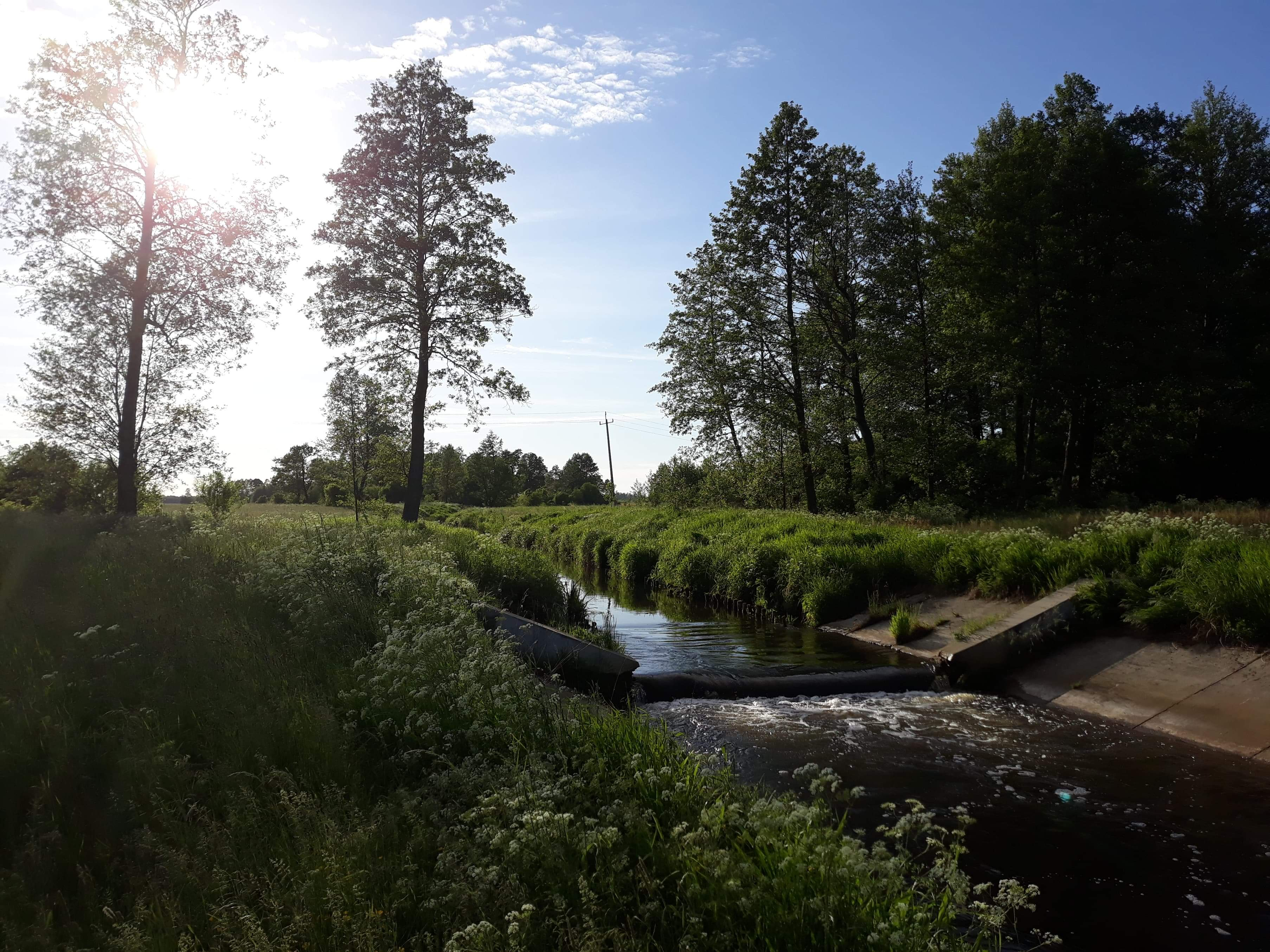

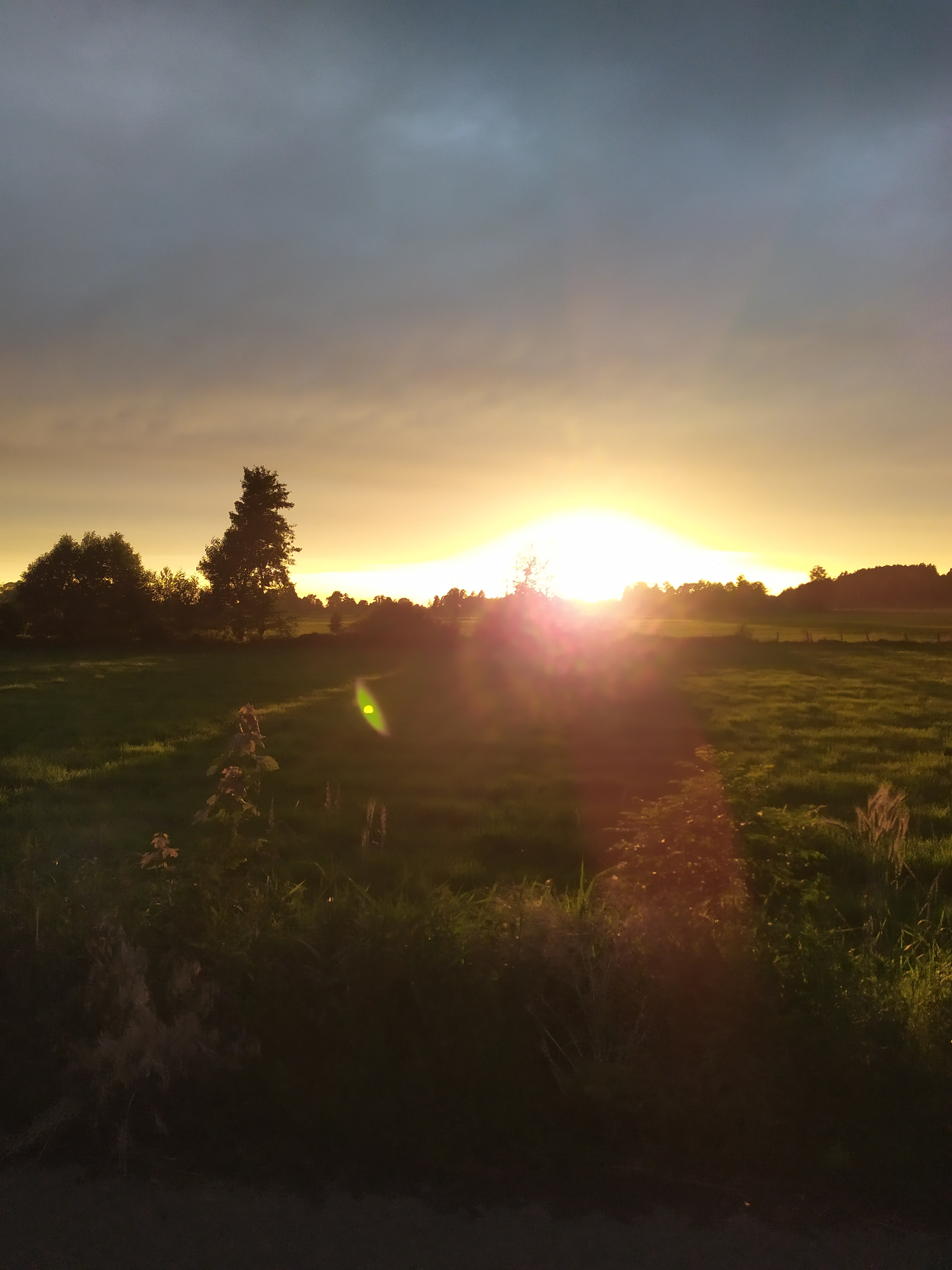

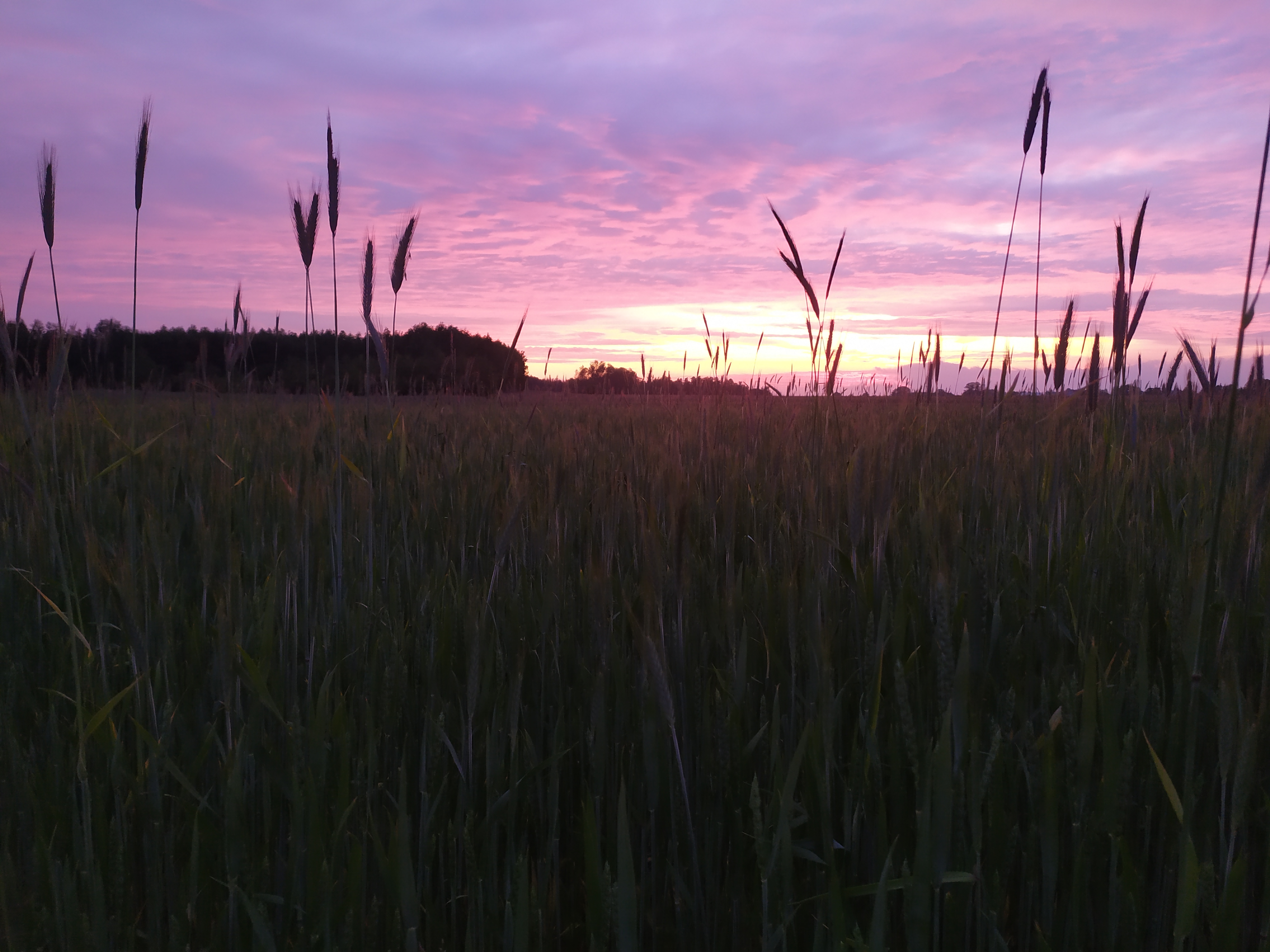

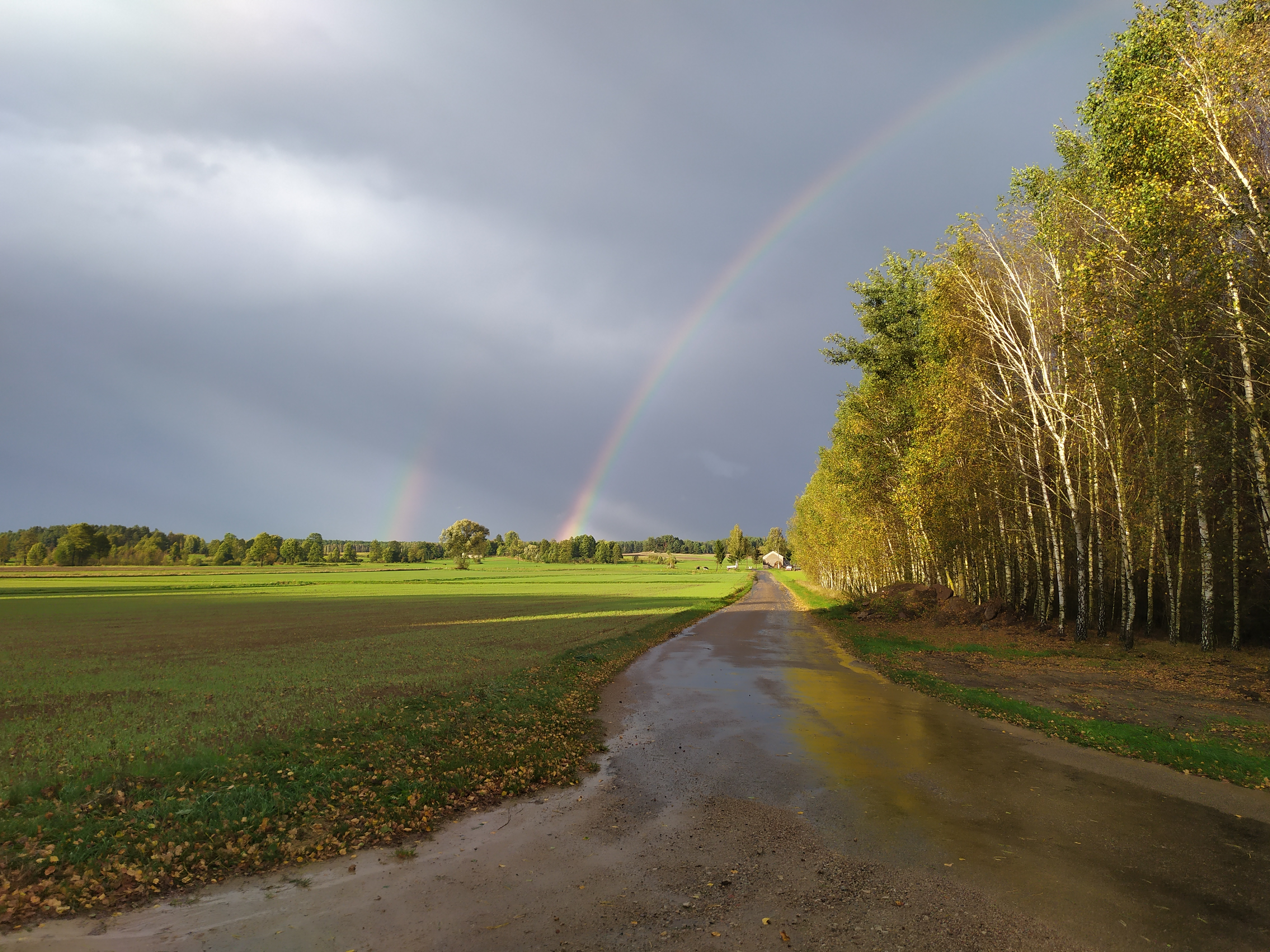

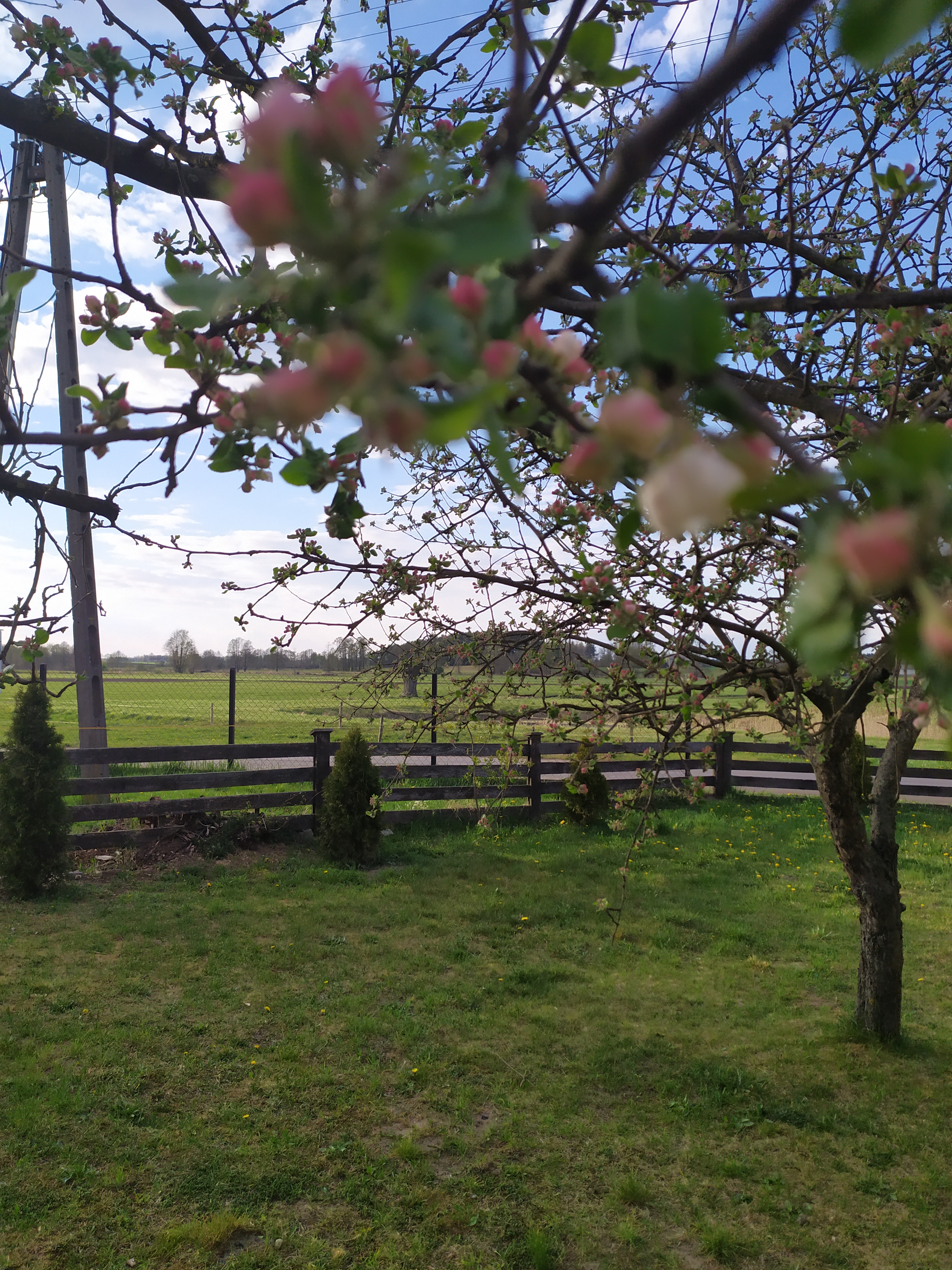
