= Rębisze-Działy =

- Village
- Location within Poland
- Coordinates: 52°55′57″N 21°34′18″E
- Country: Poland
- Voivodeship: Masovian
- County: Ostrołęka
- Gmina: Goworowo

Rębisze-Działy [rɛmˈbiʂɛ ˈd͡ʑawɨ] is a village in the administrative district of Gmina Goworowo, within Ostrołęka County, Masovian Voivodeship, in east-central Poland.
