= Sadykierz, Maków County =

Sadykierz
- Village
- Location within Poland
- Coordinates: 51°37′44″N 20°17′28″E
- Country: Poland
- Voivodeship: Masovian
- County: Maków
- Gmina: Młynarze

Sadykierz [saˈdɨkʲɛʂ] is a village in the administrative district of Gmina Młynarze, within Maków County, Masovian Voivodeship, in east-central Poland.
