= Wólka Kunińska =

- Village
- Location within Poland
- Coordinates: 52°50′50″N 21°31′50″E
- Country: Poland
- Voivodeship: Masovian
- County: Ostrołęka
- Gmina: Goworowo

Wólka Kunińska [ˈvulka kuˈniɲska] is a village in the administrative district of Gmina Goworowo, within Ostrołęka County, Masovian Voivodeship, in east-central Poland.
