= Strzemieczne-Hieronimy =

- Village
- Location within Poland
- Coordinates: 53°01′09″N 21°23′41″E
- Country: Poland
- Voivodeship: Masovian
- County: Maków
- Gmina: Młynarze

Strzemieczne-Hieronimy [stʂɛˈmjɛt͡ʂnɛ xjɛrɔˈnimɨ] is a village in the administrative district of Gmina Młynarze, within Maków County, Masovian Voivodeship, in east-central Poland.
