= Jemieliste, Masovian Voivodeship =

Jemieliste
- Village
- Location within Poland
- Coordinates: 52°50′36″N 21°36′18″E
- Country: Poland
- Voivodeship: Masovian
- County: Ostrołęka
- Gmina: Goworowo

Jemieliste [jɛmjɛˈlistɛ] is a village in the administrative district of Gmina Goworowo, within Ostrołęka County, Masovian Voivodeship, in east-central Poland.
