= Józefowo, Ostrołęka County =

Józefowo
- Village
- Location within Poland
- Coordinates: 52°51′0″N 21°33′20″E
- Country: Poland
- Voivodeship: Masovian
- County: Ostrołęka
- Gmina: Goworowo

Józefowo (Polish pronunciation: [juzɛˈfɔvɔ]) is a village in the administrative district of Gmina Goworowo, within Ostrołęka County, Masovian Voivodeship, in east-central Poland.
