= Sulęcin Szlachecki =

- Village
- Location within Poland
- Coordinates: 52°53′00″N 21°52′48″E
- Country: Poland
- Voivodeship: Masovian
- County: Ostrów
- Gmina: Stary Lubotyń

Sulęcin Szlachecki (Polish pronunciation: [suˈlɛɲtɕin ʂlaˈxɛtskʲi]) is a village in the administrative district of Gmina Stary Lubotyń, within Ostrów County, Masovian Voivodeship, in east-central Poland.
