= Modzele, Masovian Voivodeship =

Modzele
- Village
- Location within Poland
- Coordinates: 52°58′N 21°27′E
- Country: Poland
- Voivodeship: Masovian
- County: Maków
- Gmina: Młynarze

Modzele [mɔˈd͡zɛlɛ] is a village in the administrative district of Gmina Młynarze, within Maków County, Masovian Voivodeship, in east-central Poland.
