= Sieluń =

- Village
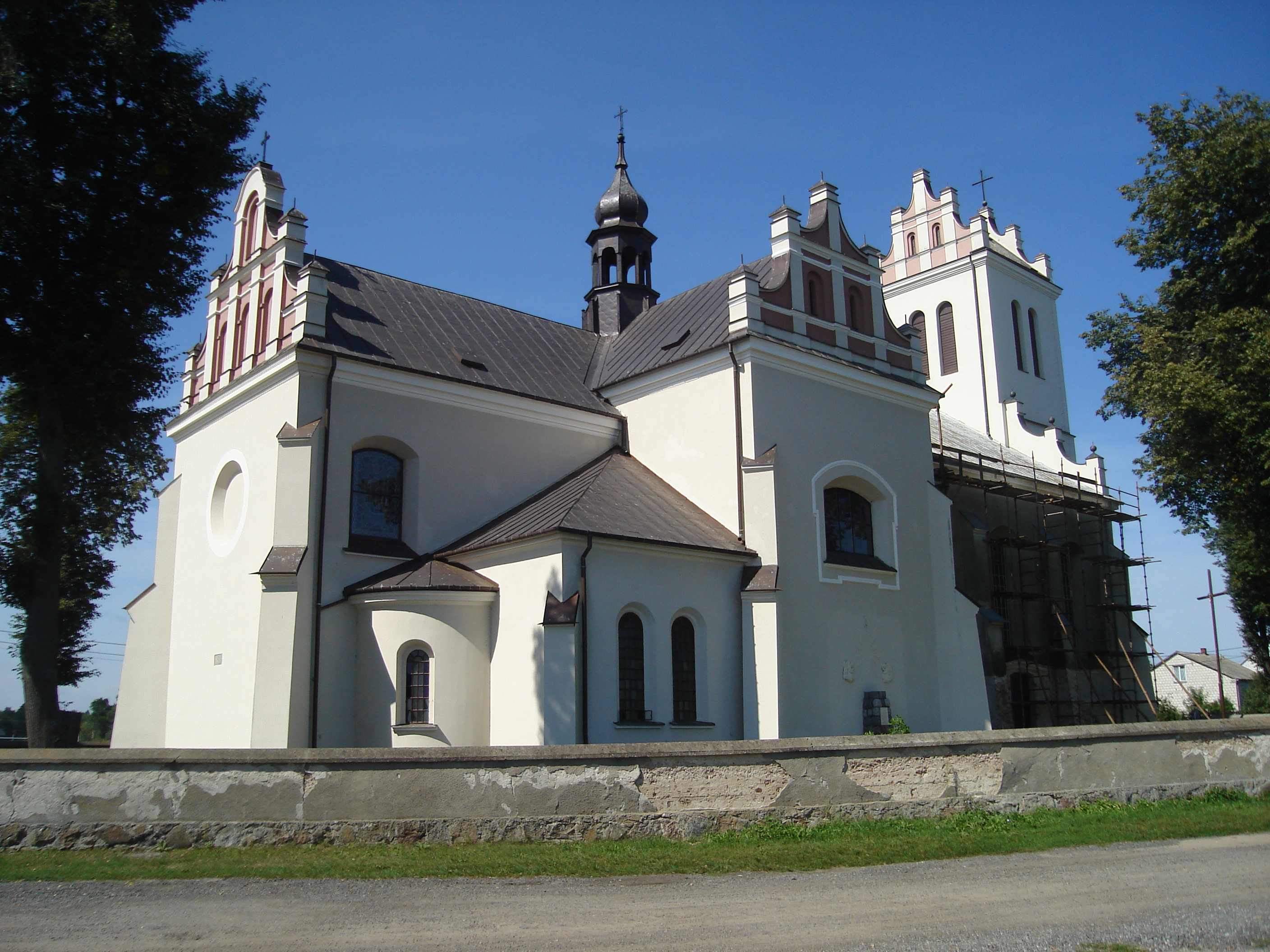
- Church of Saint Stanislaus

- Location within Poland
- Coordinates: 52°57′N 21°25′E
- Country: Poland
- Voivodeship: Masovian
- County: Maków
- Gmina: Młynarze

Sieluń [ˈɕɛluɲ] is a village in the administrative district of Gmina Młynarze, within Maków County, Masovian Voivodeship, in east-central Poland.
