= Kołaki, Masovian Voivodeship =

Kołaki
- Village
- Location within Poland
- Coordinates: 52°59′24″N 21°27′54″E
- Country: Poland
- Voivodeship: Masovian
- County: Maków
- Gmina: Młynarze
- Population (2021): 105

Kołaki [kɔˈwaki] is a village in the administrative district of Gmina Młynarze, within Maków County, Masovian Voivodeship, in east-central Poland.
