= Stary Susk =

- Village
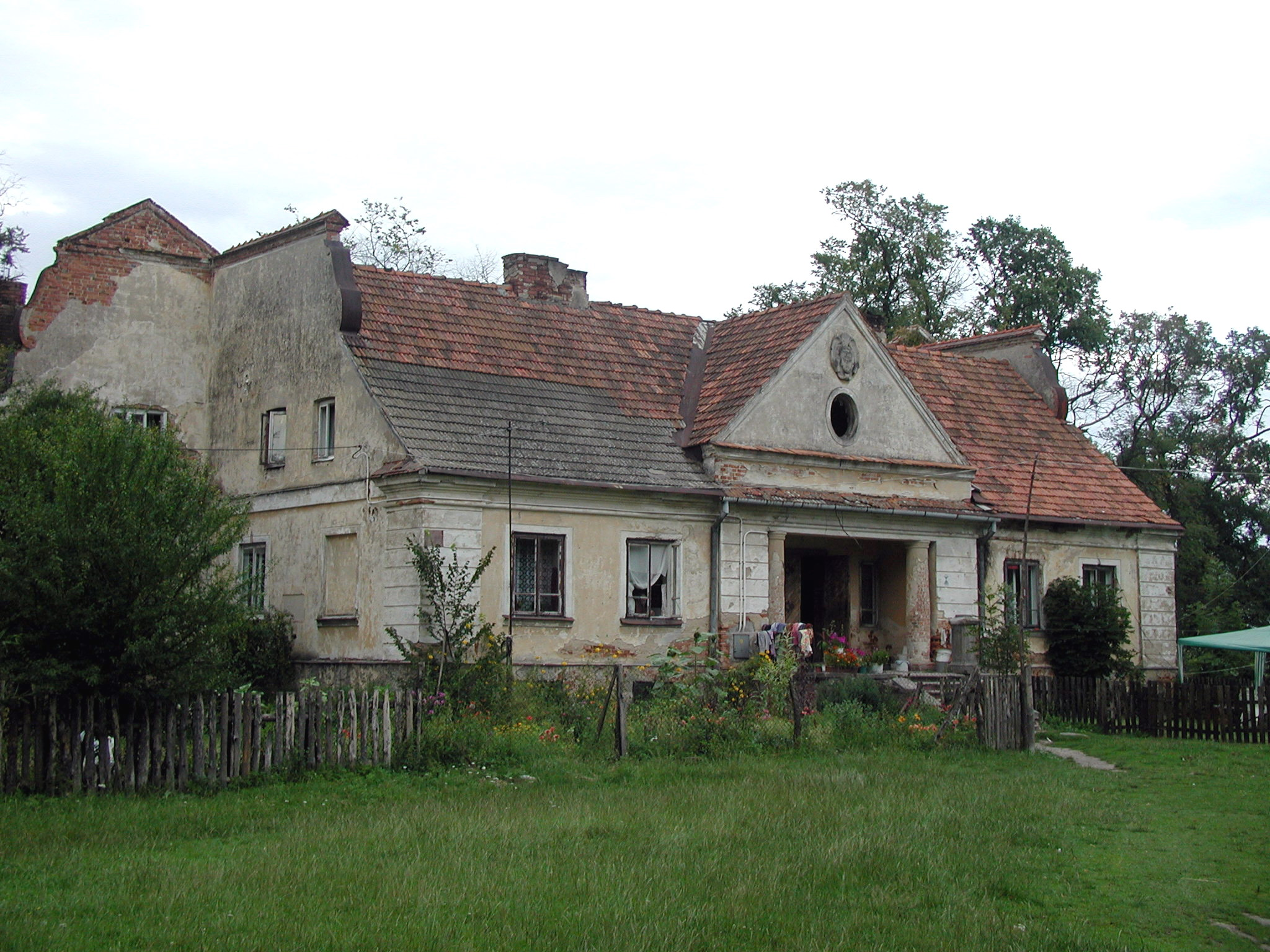
- Old manor house in Stary Susk

- Location within Poland
- Coordinates: 53°4′3″N 21°40′20″E
- Country: Poland
- Voivodeship: Masovian
- County: Ostrołęka
- Gmina: Rzekuń

Stary Susk [ˈstarɨ ˈsusk] is a village in the administrative district of Gmina Rzekuń, within Ostrołęka County, Masovian Voivodeship, in east-central Poland.
