= Żabin, Masovian Voivodeship =

Żabin
- Village
- Location within Poland
- Coordinates: 52°56′47″N 21°34′27″E
- Country: Poland
- Voivodeship: Masovian
- County: Ostrołęka
- Gmina: Goworowo

Żabin [ˈʐabin] is a village in the administrative district of Gmina Goworowo, within Ostrołęka County, Masovian Voivodeship, in east-central Poland.
