= Kunin (Poland) =

- Village
- Location within Poland
- Coordinates: 52°51′N 21°30′E
- Country: Poland
- Voivodeship: Masovian
- County: Ostrołęka
- Gmina: Goworowo

Kunin [ˈkunin] is a village in the administrative district of Gmina Goworowo, within Ostrołęka County, Masovian Voivodeship, in east-central Poland.
