= Jawory Stare =

- Village
- Location within Poland
- Coordinates: 52°55′37″N 21°31′12″E
- Country: Poland
- Voivodeship: Masovian
- County: Ostrołęka
- Gmina: Goworowo

Jawory Stare [jaˈvɔrɨ-'starɛ] is a village in the administrative district of Gmina Goworowo, within Ostrołęka County, Masovian Voivodeship, in east-central Poland.

Righteous Among the Nations Jadwiga Dudziec was born here.
