= Strzemieczne-Oleksy =

- Village
- Location within Poland
- Coordinates: 52°59′53″N 21°24′16″E
- Country: Poland
- Voivodeship: Masovian
- County: Maków
- Gmina: Młynarze

Strzemieczne-Oleksy [stʂɛˈmjɛt͡ʂnɛ ɔˈlɛksɨ] is a village in the administrative district of Gmina Młynarze, within Maków County, Masovian Voivodeship, in east-central Poland.
