= Pokrzywnica, Ostrołęka County =

Pokrzywnica
- Village
- Location within Poland
- Coordinates: 52°55′10″N 21°36′17″E
- Country: Poland
- Voivodeship: Masovian
- County: Ostrołęka
- Gmina: Goworowo

Pokrzywnica [pɔkʂɨvˈnit͡sa] is a village in the administrative district of Gmina Goworowo, within Ostrołęka County, Masovian Voivodeship, in east-central Poland.
