= Nogawki =

- Village
- Location within Poland
- Coordinates: 52°57′N 21°37′E
- Country: Poland
- Voivodeship: Masovian
- County: Ostrołęka
- Gmina: Goworowo

Nogawki [nɔˈɡafki] is a village in the administrative district of Gmina Goworowo, within Ostrołęka County, Masovian Voivodeship, in east-central Poland.
