= Rębisze-Kolonia =

- Village
- Location within Poland
- Coordinates: 52°55′1″N 21°33′26″E
- Country: Poland
- Voivodeship: Masovian
- County: Ostrołęka
- Gmina: Goworowo

Rębisze-Kolonia [rɛmˈbiʂɛ kɔˈlɔɲa] is a village in the administrative district of Gmina Goworowo, within Ostrołęka County, Masovian Voivodeship, in east-central Poland.
