= Jurgi, Masovian Voivodeship =

Jurgi
- Village
- Location within Poland
- Coordinates: 52°51′32″N 21°30′56″E
- Country: Poland
- Voivodeship: Masovian
- County: Ostrołęka
- Gmina: Goworowo

Jurgi [ˈjurɡi] is a village in the administrative district of Gmina Goworowo, within Ostrołęka County, Masovian Voivodeship, in east-central Poland.
