= Church of the Ascension, Vilnius =

Roman Catholic church in Vilnius, Lithuania built in 1695–1730

Church of the Ascension Viešpaties Dangun Žengimo bažnyčia
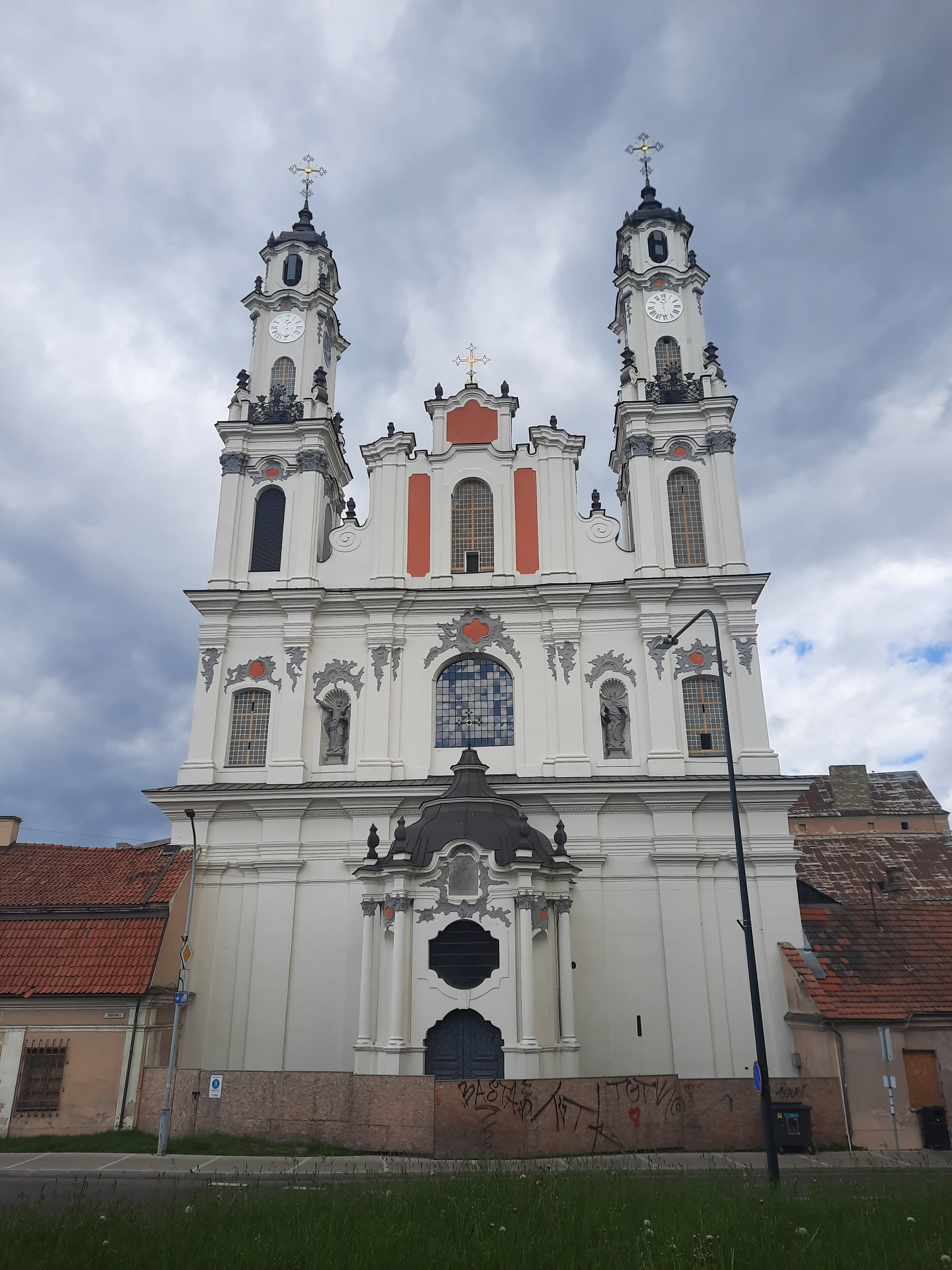
- Façade of the church in 2026

Religion
- Affiliation: Roman Catholic
- Diocese: Vilnius Old Town
- Ecclesiastical or organisational status: Used as a church
- Year consecrated: 1730

Location
- Location: Vilnius, Lithuania
- Interactive map of Church of the Ascension; Viešpaties Dangun Žengimo bažnyčia
- Coordinates: 54°40′36″N 25°17′46″E

Architecture
- Architect: Johann Christoph Glaubitz
- Type: Church
- Style: Baroque
- Completed: 1730
- Materials: Plastered masonry

Church of the Ascension (Lithuanian: Viešpaties Dangun Žengimo bažnyčia) is a Roman Catholic church in the Vilnius Old Town. Its construction began in 1695, but due to the lack of funding it was completed only after 35 years in 1730 and in the same year was it was consecrated as Church of the Ascension.

The missionary priests arrived in the Commonwealth from France. They primarily focused on educating the clergy. Their monastery in Vilnius was established through the foundation of the military figure from Inflanty, Teofil Plater, and his wife, Aleksandra. In 1695, the missionary priests began constructing a church dedicated to the Ascension of the Lord on the Mount of Salvation. In 1706, the church's roof was destroyed by fire. The construction was temporarily halted in 1708 due to an invasion by the Swedish army during the Great Northern War. The completion of the large brick church was made possible by the generosity of donors supported by the founder, including the Grand Marshal of Lithuania, Antoni Nowosielski, it was from his funds that, in 1722, two towers and the facade of the church were built, among other things. The construction continued until 1730. Neither the architect nor the builder of the structure is known by name. It is presumed that there were several, considering the relatively long duration of the church's construction.

In 1750–1754 the towers of the church were elevated according to a project by architect Johann Christoph Glaubitz in the style of Vilnian Baroque and in 1755–1756 the church porch was built. The façade of the church is abundantly decorated with rococo moldings. However, the interior of the church is quite modest and represent the values of the Congregation of the Mission.

Near the church there is a former monastery of the Congregation of the Mission. The complex also had a hospital. The Missionaries named the hill on which the complex was built as Saviour's Hill.

The upper two levels of the towers are adorned with corner pilasters, which feature coins and vases. In the niches of the second level of the main facade, there are two wooden sculptures from the 18th century. David is located in the eastern section, while Moses is in the western section. The height of the figure of David is 2.20 m, and that of Moses is 2.29 m, both standing on low (0.71 m and 0.61 m) profiled pedestals. The church has been constructed with crypts for the founders intended for burial. The church building is decorated with numerous baroque statues and embellishments, although the interior remains rather modest compared to the facade of the church. During the time when the Church of St. Johns housed 22 altars, the Ascension church had only seven. The church and chapels are adorned with scenes from the lives of saints and portraits of saints associated with the activities of missionaries. The church serves as the burial site for the family of the castellan of Nowogródek, the Grand Duchy of Lithuania, Antoni Nowosielski, as well as the cupbearer of Lithuania, Leon Nowosielski.

Since 2022 the complex was under reconstruction.

== Gallery ==
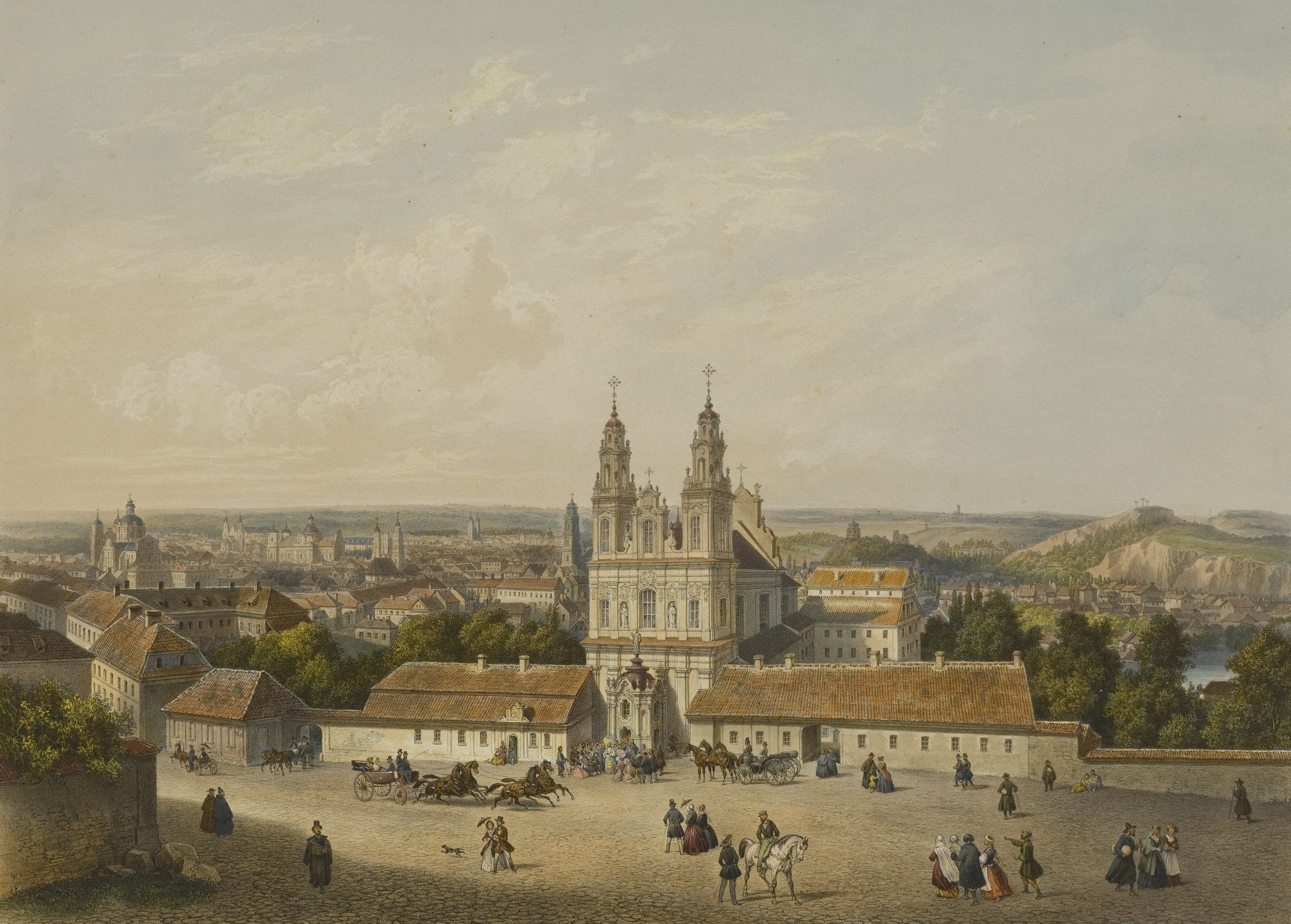
Painting of the complex by Zygmunt Vogel

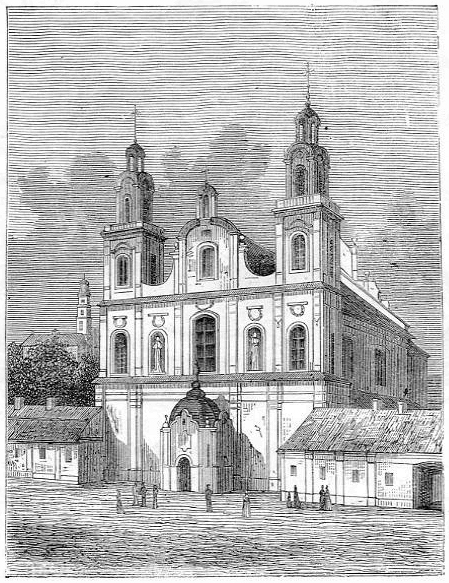
Painting of the church, 1876

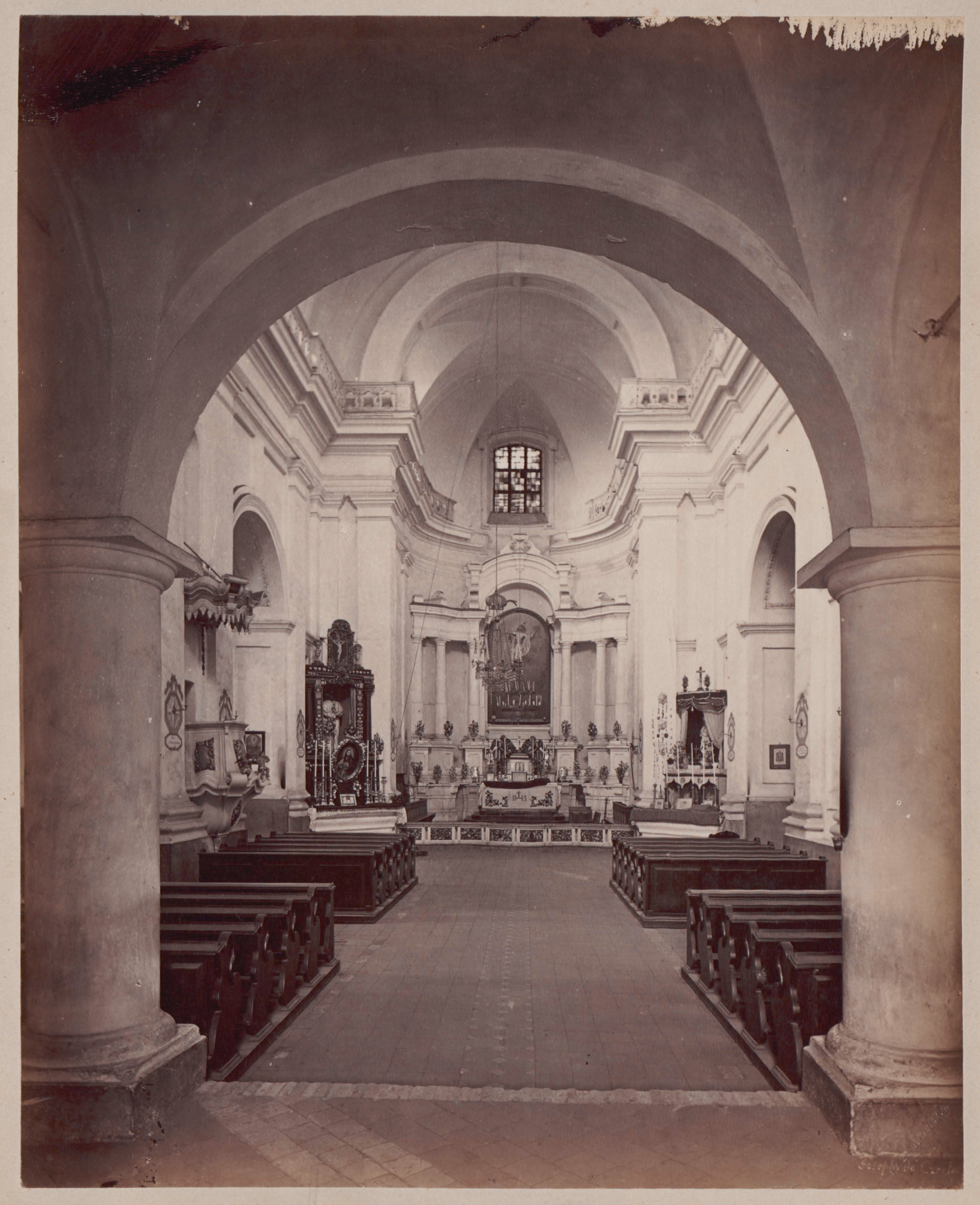
Interior of the church in 1875–1885

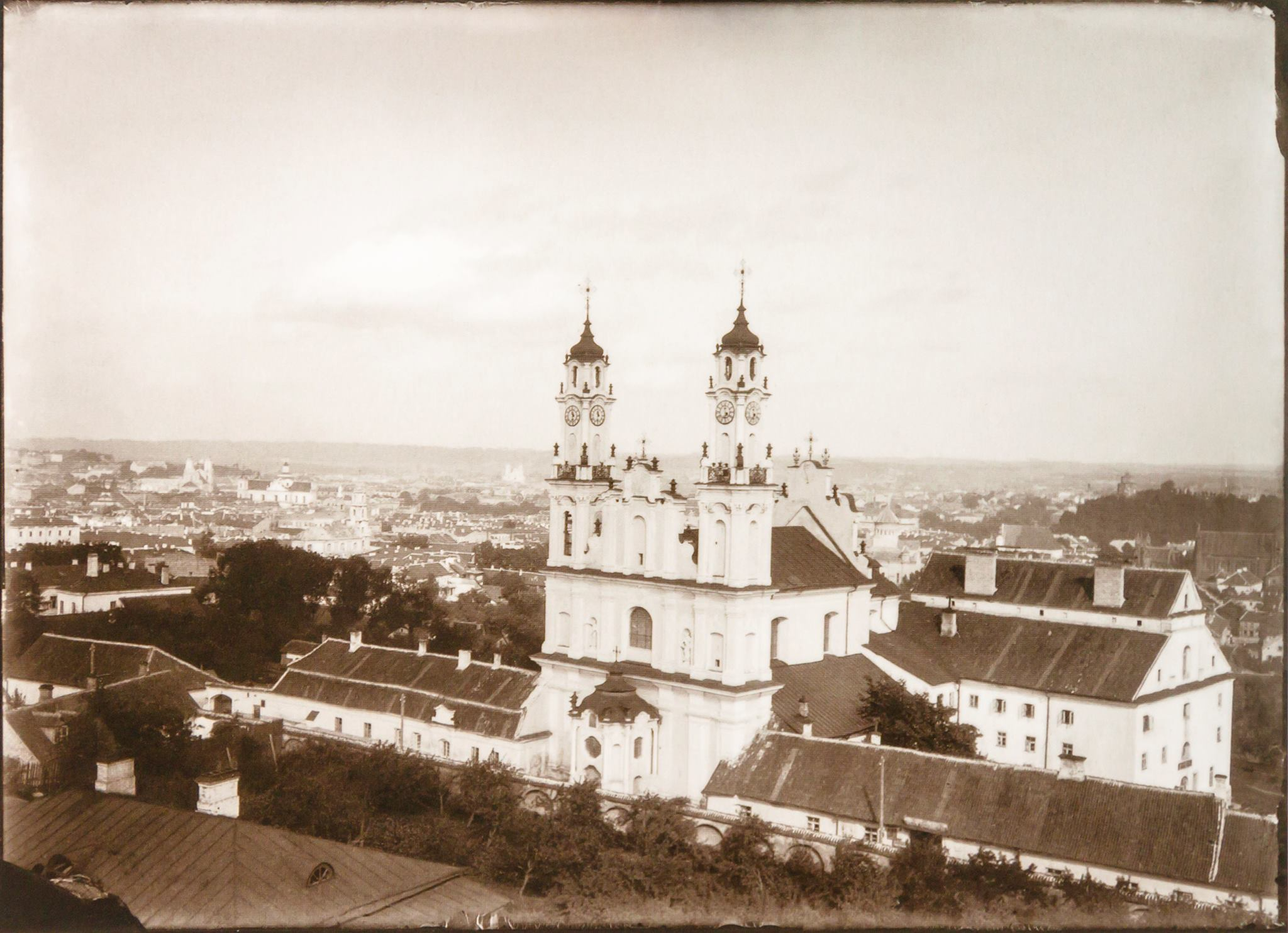
Aerial photo of the complex in 1896
