= Daniłowo, Ostrołęka County =

Daniłowo
- Village
- Location within Poland
- Coordinates: 52°54′17″N 21°31′57″E
- Country: Poland
- Voivodeship: Masovian
- County: Ostrołęka
- Gmina: Goworowo

Daniłowo [daniˈwɔvɔ] is a village in the administrative district of Gmina Goworowo, within Ostrołęka County, Masovian Voivodeship, in east-central Poland.
