= Gierwaty, Ostrołęka County =

Gierwaty
- Village
- Location within Poland
- Coordinates: 52°58′53″N 21°36′00″E
- Country: Poland
- Voivodeship: Masovian
- County: Ostrołęka
- Gmina: Goworowo

Gierwaty [ɡjɛrˈvatɨ] is a village in the administrative district of Gmina Goworowo, within Ostrołęka County, Masovian Voivodeship, in east-central Poland.
