= Zaorze, Gmina Goworowo =

Zaorze
- Village
- Location within Poland
- Coordinates: 52°51′4″N 21°29′29″E
- Country: Poland
- Voivodeship: Masovian
- County: Ostrołęka
- Gmina: Goworowo

Zaorze [zaˈɔʐɛ] is a village in the administrative district of Gmina Goworowo, within Ostrołęka County, Masovian Voivodeship, in east-central Poland.
