= Rupin, Maków County =

Rupin
- Village
- Location within Poland
- Coordinates: 52°57′N 21°22′E
- Country: Poland
- Voivodeship: Masovian
- County: Maków
- Gmina: Młynarze

Rupin [ˈrupin] is a village in the administrative district of Gmina Młynarze, within Maków County, Masovian Voivodeship, in east-central Poland. As of 2021 Rupin had a total population of 89 people.
