= Ogony =

- Village
- Location within Poland
- Coordinates: 52°57′N 21°26′E
- Country: Poland
- Voivodeship: Masovian
- County: Maków
- Gmina: Młynarze
- Highest elevation: 110 m (360 ft)
- Lowest elevation: 90 m (300 ft)

Ogony [ɔˈɡɔnɨ] is a village in the administrative district of Gmina Młynarze, within Maków County, Masovian Voivodeship, in east-central Poland.
