= Grabowo, Gmina Goworowo =

Grabowo
- Village
- Location within Poland
- Coordinates: 52°57′18″N 21°35′39″E
- Country: Poland
- Voivodeship: Masovian
- County: Ostrołęka
- Gmina: Goworowo
- Population: 240

Grabowo [ɡraˈbɔvɔ] is a village in the administrative district of Gmina Goworowo, within Ostrołęka County, Masovian Voivodeship, in east-central Poland.
