= Młynarze, Maków County =

Młynarze
- Village
- Location within Poland
- Coordinates: 52°58′N 21°26′E
- Country: Poland
- Voivodeship: Masovian
- County: Maków
- Gmina: Młynarze

Population
  - Total: 1,950
- Time zone: UTC+1 (CET)
  - Summer (DST): UTC+2 (CEST)

Młynarze [mwɨˈnaʐɛ] is a village in Maków County, Masovian Voivodeship, in east-central Poland. It is the seat of the gmina (administrative district) called Gmina Młynarze.

Five Polish citizens were murdered by Nazi Germany in the village during World War II.
