= Gniazdowo, Masovian Voivodeship =

Gniazdowo
- Village
- Location within Poland
- Coordinates: 52°56′N 21°53′E
- Country: Poland
- Voivodeship: Masovian
- County: Ostrów
- Gmina: Stary Lubotyń
- Vehicle registration: WOR

Gniazdowo [ɡɲazˈdɔvɔ] is a village in the administrative district of Gmina Stary Lubotyń, within Ostrów County, Masovian Voivodeship, in east-central Poland.

== History ==
In 1827, Gniazdowo had a population of 222.

During the German invasion of Poland which started World War II, on September 10, 1939, German troops carried out a massacre of some 20 Poles (see Nazi crimes against the Polish nation).
