= Cisk, Poland =

Cisk
- Village
- Location within Poland
- Coordinates: 52°57′43″N 21°32′32″E
- Country: Poland
- Voivodeship: Masovian
- County: Ostrołęka
- Gmina: Goworowo

Cisk [t͡ɕisk] is a village in the administrative district of Gmina Goworowo, within Ostrołęka County, Masovian Voivodeship, in east-central Poland.
