= Szczawin, Ostrołęka County =

Szczawin
- Village
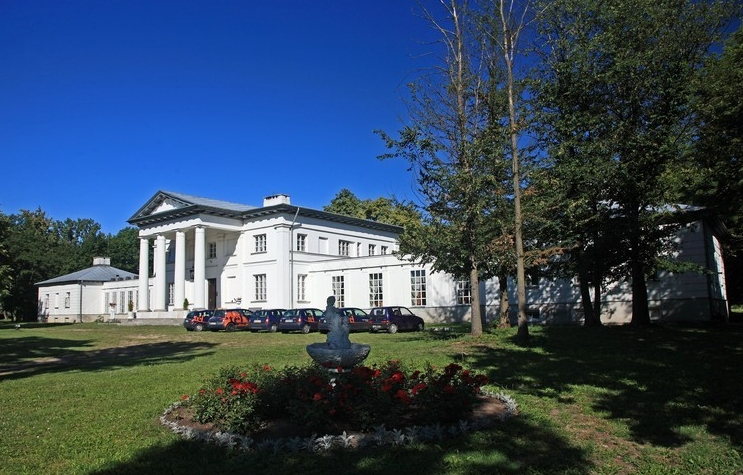
- Palace in Szczawin

- Location within Poland
- Coordinates: 52°53′57″N 21°31′46″E
- Country: Poland
- Voivodeship: Masovian
- County: Ostrołęka
- Gmina: Goworowo

Szczawin [ˈʂt͡ʂavin] is a village in the administrative district of Gmina Goworowo, within Ostrołęka County, Masovian Voivodeship, in east-central Poland.
