= IS-5 Kaczka =

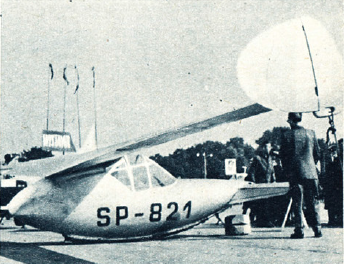

General information
- Type: Glider
- National origin: Poland
- Manufacturer: Jeżów Glider Workshop
- Designer: T. Kosti and I. Kaniewska
- Number built: 1

History
- First flight: 29 March 1949

The IS-5 Kaczka (Instytut Szybownictwa – gliding institute) was a single-seat canard research glider designed and built in Poland from 1948.

== Development ==
The IS-5 Kaczka (Duck) was designed by T. Kosti and I. Kaniewska, and built at the Jeżów Glider Workshop, as a research aircraft to investigate tail-first canard aircraft. The all-wood fuselage was formed from a semi-monocoque shell to form a pod under the wing containing the cockpit, with a nose extending forwards to support the canard surfaces. At the rear of the nacelle an airbrake was formed from two halves of the fuselage opening outwards, in similar fashion to the airbrakes on certain jet attack aircraft, like the Hawker-Siddeley Buccaneer (at the rear of the fuselage) and Grumman A-6 Intruder (at the wing-tips).

The wings were of conventional construction with a ply-covered torsion box forming the leading edge forward of the mainspar and fabric-covered ribs to the rear of the main-spar. Ovoid-shaped fins with rudders were fitted at the wing-tips; also skids for support when static on the ground. The use of drag rudders was also investigated with the rudders opening in similar fashion to the airbrake, increasing drag on one side and yawing the aircraft. The centre of gravity was also adjustable in flight, with a 7 kg (15 lb) weight, on a fore-aft orientated threaded rod, which could be adjusted by the pilot.

The sole prototype SP-821 first flew on 29 Mar 1949 piloted by Eng. P. Mynarski. Trials continued until 1957. The IS-5 was reported to have good flying characteristics and was easy to fly. After completion of tests the aircraft was lodged with the Lodz gliding club where it was destroyed in a hangar fire in 1961.

== Specifications (IS-5 Kaczka) ==
Data from The World's Sailplanes:Die Segelflugzeuge der Welt:Les Planeurs du Monde Volume II

General characteristics

- Crew: 1
- Length: 4 m (13 ft 1 in)
- Wingspan: 11.56 m (37 ft 11 in)
- Wing area: 10 m^{2} (110 sq ft)
- Aspect ratio: 13
- Airfoil: Peyret 2
- Empty weight: 159 kg (351 lb)
- Gross weight: 257 kg (567 lb)

Performance

- Stall speed: 63 km/h (39 mph, 34 kn)
- Never exceed speed: 250 km/h (160 mph, 130 kn)
- Rough air speed max: 136 km/h (85 mph; 73 kn)
- Aerotow speed: 130 km/h (81 mph; 70 kn)
- Winch launch speed: 95 km/h (59 mph; 51 kn)
- g limits: +6 -3 at 125 km/h (78 mph; 67 kn)
- Maximum glide ratio: 17.3 at 81 km/h (50 mph; 44 kn)
- Rate of sink: 1.26 m/s (248 ft/min) at 76 km/h (47 mph; 41 kn)
- Wing loading: 25.7 kg/m^{2} (5.3 lb/sq ft)

== See also ==
Aircraft of comparable role, configuration, and era

- Rutan Solitaire
