= Rząśnik, Gmina Stary Lubotyń =

Rząśnik
- Village
- Location within Poland
- Coordinates: 52°56′35″N 21°59′24″E
- Country: Poland
- Voivodeship: Masovian
- County: Ostrów
- Gmina: Stary Lubotyń
- Population: 264

Rząśnik (Polish pronunciation: [ˈʐɔ̃ɕɲik]) is a village in the administrative district of Gmina Stary Lubotyń, within Ostrów County, Masovian Voivodeship, in east-central Poland.

== History ==
During World War II, in summer 1941, about 2,600 Jews from nearby villages are murdered in mass executions perpetrated by an Einsatzgruppen.
