= Goworowo, Ostrołęka County =

Goworowo
- Village
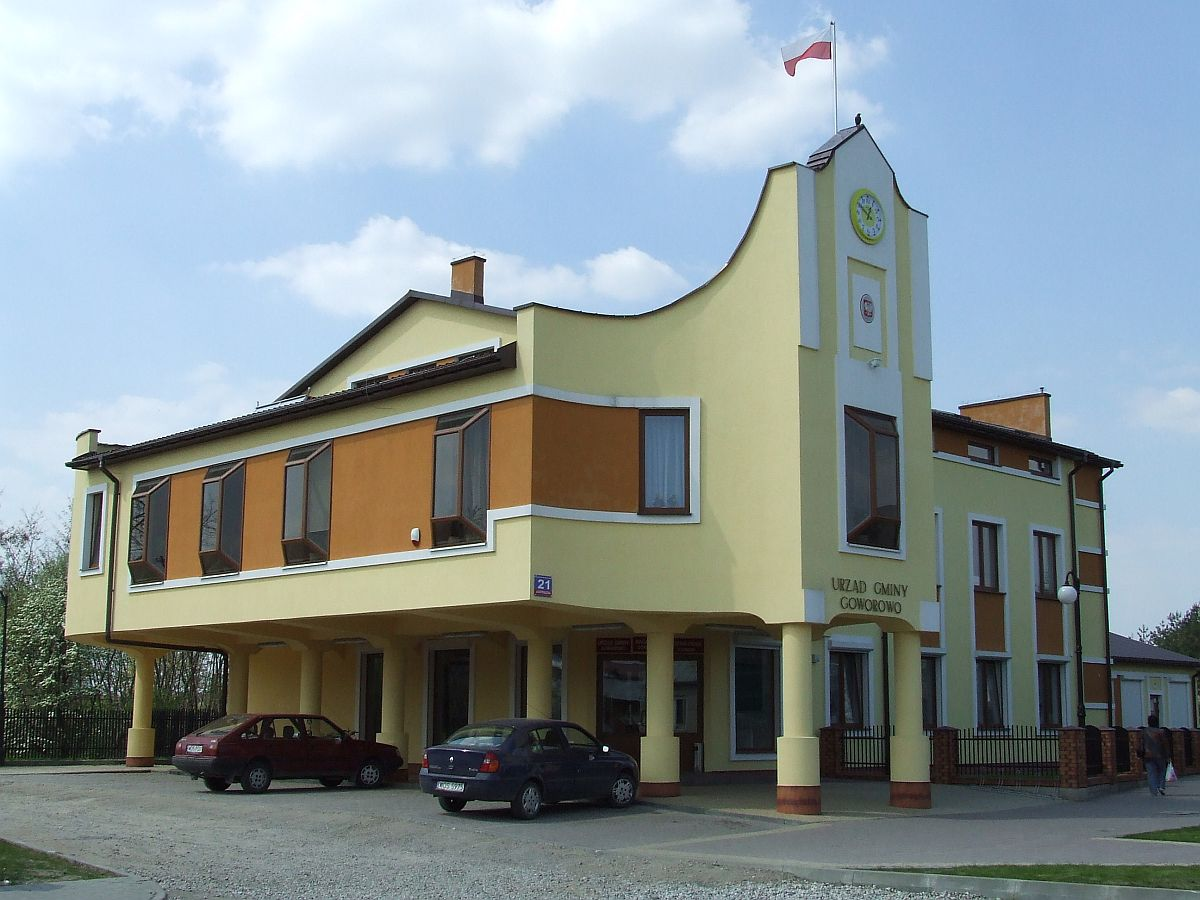
- Gmina Goworowo administration building

- Location within Poland
- Coordinates: 52°54′2″N 21°33′16″E
- Country: Poland
- Voivodeship: Masovian
- County: Ostrołęka
- Gmina: Goworowo

Population
  - Total: 820
- Time zone: UTC+1 (CET)
  - Summer (DST): UTC+2 (CEST)
- Postal code: 07-440
- Vehicle registration: WOS

Goworowo [ɡɔvɔˈrɔvɔ] is a village in Ostrołęka County, Masovian Voivodeship, in east-central Poland. It is the seat of the gmina (administrative district) called Gmina Goworowo.
