= Krzyżewo =

Krzyżewo may refer to the following places:

- Krzyżewo, Podlaskie Voivodeship (north-east Poland)
- Krzyżewo, Braniewo County, Warmian-Masurian Voivodeship (north Poland)
- Krzyżewo, Ełk County, Warmian-Masurian Voivodeship (north Poland)
- Krzyżewo Borowe, Maków County, Masovian Voivodeship (east-central Poland)
- Krzyżewo-Jurki, Maków County, Masovian Voivodeship (east-central Poland)
- Krzyżewo Nadrzeczne, Maków County, Masovian Voivodeship (east-central Poland)
- Krzyżewo-Marki, Maków County, Masovian Voivodeship (east-central Poland)

== See also ==
- Krzyżewski
