= Chodkowo (disambiguation) =

Chodkowo may refer to:

- Chodkowo
- Chodkowo-Działki
- Chodkowo Wielkie
- Chodkowo-Biernaty
- Chodkowo-Kuchny
- Chodkowo-Załogi
