= Szczuki, Masovian Voivodeship =

Szczuki
- Village
- Location within Poland
- Coordinates: 52°56′N 20°59′E
- Country: Poland
- Voivodeship: Masovian
- County: Maków
- Gmina: Płoniawy-Bramura

Population
  - Total: 1,000
- Time zone: UTC+1 (CET)
  - Summer (DST): UTC+2 (CEST)
- Vehicle registration: WMA

Szczuki [ˈʂt͡ʂuki] is a village in the administrative district of Gmina Płoniawy-Bramura, within Maków County, Masovian Voivodeship, in east-central Poland. It is situated on the Węgierka River, a tributary of the Orzyc River.

== History ==
Historical population
Year	Pop.
1827	80
1921	433

Szczuki was a possession of Count Ludwik Józef Krasiński, one of the wealthiest Poles of the 19th-century, who founded the Krasiniec sugar factory by the village at which the Krasiniec settlement eventually emerged.

== Notable people ==
- Jan Andrzej Krasiński (1550–1612), historian, secretary of King Stephen Báthory
- Kazimierz Żorawski (1866–1953), mathematician
