= Boruty =

Boruty may refer to the following places:

- Boruty, Grójec County in Masovian Voivodeship (east-central Poland)
- Boruty, Gmina Rzewnie in Masovian Voivodeship (east-central Poland)
- Boruty, Gmina Sypniewo in Masovian Voivodeship (east-central Poland)
