= Majki-Tykiewki =

- Village
- Location within Poland
- Coordinates: 53°2′N 21°18′E
- Country: Poland
- Voivodeship: Masovian
- County: Maków
- Gmina: Sypniewo

Majki-Tykiewki [ˈmai̯ki tɨˈkʲɛfki] is a village in the administrative district of Gmina Sypniewo, within Maków County, Masovian Voivodeship, in east-central Poland.
