= Stare Zacisze =

- Village
- Location within Poland
- Coordinates: 52°55′48″N 21°06′51″E
- Country: Poland
- Voivodeship: Masovian
- County: Maków
- Gmina: Płoniawy-Bramura

Stare Zacisze [ˈstarɛ zaˈt͡ɕiʂɛ] is a village in the administrative district of Gmina Płoniawy-Bramura, within Maków County, Masovian Voivodeship, in east-central Poland.
