= Chrzczony, Maków County =

Village in Gmina Rzewnie, Poland

Chrzczony
- Village
- Location within Poland
- Coordinates: 52°50′08″N 21°19′30″E
- Country: Poland
- Voivodeship: Masovian
- County: Maków
- Gmina: Rzewnie

Chrzczony [ˈxʂt͡ʂɔnɨ] is a village in the administrative district of Gmina Rzewnie, within Maków County, Masovian Voivodeship, in east-central Poland.
