= Cieciórki Szlacheckie =

- Village
- Location within Poland
- Coordinates: 52°55′35″N 21°11′48″E
- Country: Poland
- Voivodeship: Masovian
- County: Maków
- Gmina: Czerwonka

Cieciórki Szlacheckie (Polish pronunciation: [tɕɛˈtɕurkʲi ʂlaˈxɛtskʲɛ]) is a village in the administrative district of Gmina Czerwonka, within Maków County, Masovian Voivodeship, in east-central Poland.
