= Nowy Krasnosielc =

- Village
- Location within Poland
- Coordinates: 53°02′29″N 21°08′31″E
- Country: Poland
- Voivodeship: Masovian
- County: Maków
- Gmina: Krasnosielc

Nowy Krasnosielc [ˈnɔvɨ krasˈnɔɕɛlt͡s] is a village in the administrative district of Gmina Krasnosielc, within Maków County, Masovian Voivodeship, in east-central Poland.
