= Poświętne, Maków County =

Poświętne
- Village
- Location within Poland
- Coordinates: 52°58′N 21°15′E
- Country: Poland
- Voivodeship: Masovian
- County: Maków
- Gmina: Sypniewo

Poświętne [pɔɕˈfjɛntnɛ] is a village in the administrative district of Gmina Sypniewo, within Maków County, Masovian Voivodeship, in east-central Poland.
