= Zaręby, Maków County =

Zaręby
- Village
- Location within Poland
- Coordinates: 52°53′19″N 21°00′22″E
- Country: Poland
- Voivodeship: Masovian
- County: Maków
- Gmina: Karniewo

Zaręby [zaˈrɛmbɨ] is a village in the administrative district of Gmina Karniewo, within Maków County, Masovian Voivodeship, in east-central Poland.
