= Gościejewo =

Gościejewo may refer to the following places:

- Gościejewo, Greater Poland Voivodeship (west-central Poland)
- Gościejewo, Masovian Voivodeship (east-central Poland)
- Gościejewo, West Pomeranian Voivodeship (north-west Poland)
