= Drążdżewo-Kujawy =

- Village
- Location within Poland
- Coordinates: 53°05′49″N 21°06′10″E
- Country: Poland
- Voivodeship: Masovian
- County: Maków
- Gmina: Krasnosielc

Drążdżewo-Kujawy [drɔ̃ʐˈd͡ʐɛvɔ kuˈjavɨ] is a village in the administrative district of Gmina Krasnosielc, in Maków County, Masovian Voivodeship, in east-central Poland.
