= Lipniki, Maków County =

Lipniki
- Village
- Location within Poland
- Coordinates: 52°53′36″N 21°16′1″E
- Country: Poland
- Voivodeship: Masovian
- County: Maków
- Gmina: Czerwonka
- Population: 80

Lipniki (Polish pronunciation: [lipˈɲikʲi]) is a village in the administrative district of Gmina Czerwonka, within Maków County, Masovian Voivodeship, in east-central Poland.
