= Czarnostów =

- Village
- Location within Poland
- Coordinates: 52°48′N 21°0′E
- Country: Poland
- Voivodeship: Masovian
- County: Maków
- Gmina: Karniewo

Czarnostów [t͡ʂarˈnɔstuf] is a village in the administrative district of Gmina Karniewo, within Maków County, Masovian Voivodeship, in east-central Poland.
