= Węgrzynowo =

Węgrzynowo may refer to:

- Węgrzynowo, Maków County in Masovian Voivodeship (east-central Poland)
- Węgrzynowo, Płock County in Masovian Voivodeship (central Poland)
- Węgrzynowo, Sierpc County in Masovian Voivodeship (north-central Poland)
