= Wronowo =

Wronowo may refer to the following places:

- Wronowo, Greater Poland Voivodeship (west-central Poland)
- Wronowo, Masovian Voivodeship (east-central Poland)
- Wronowo, Podlaskie Voivodeship (north-east Poland)
