= Niesułowo-Wieś =

Village in Gmina Krasnosielc, Poland

- Village
- Location within Poland
- Coordinates: 53°03′49″N 21°16′06″E
- Country: Poland
- Voivodeship: Masovian
- County: Maków
- Gmina: Krasnosielc

Niesułowo-Wieś [ɲɛsuˈwɔvɔ ˈvjɛɕ] is a village in the administrative district of Gmina Krasnosielc, within Maków County, Masovian Voivodeship, in east-central Poland.
