= Miłony =

- Village
- Location within Poland
- Coordinates: 52°54′37″N 21°21′44″E
- Country: Poland
- Voivodeship: Masovian
- County: Maków
- Gmina: Różan

Miłony [miˈwɔnɨ] is a village in the administrative district of Gmina Różan, within Maków County, Masovian Voivodeship, in east-central Poland. It is located about 4 km (2 mi) north west of Różan
