= Rogowo, Maków County =

Rogowo
- Village
- Location within Poland
- Coordinates: 53°2′N 21°1′E
- Country: Poland
- Voivodeship: Masovian
- County: Maków
- Gmina: Płoniawy-Bramura

Rogowo [rɔˈɡɔvɔ] is a village in the administrative district of Gmina Płoniawy-Bramura, within Maków County, Masovian Voivodeship, in east-central Poland.
