= Załęże-Gartki =

- Village
- Location within Poland
- Coordinates: 52°56′13″N 21°21′27″E
- Country: Poland
- Voivodeship: Masovian
- County: Maków
- Gmina: Różan

Załęże-Gartki [zaˈwɛ̃ʐɛ ˈɡartki] is a village in the administrative district of Gmina Różan, within Maków County, Masovian Voivodeship, in east-central Poland.
