= Rzechowo-Gać =

- Village
- Location within Poland
- Coordinates: 52°56′40″N 21°14′02″E
- Country: Poland
- Voivodeship: Masovian
- County: Maków
- Gmina: Sypniewo

Rzechowo-Gać (Polish pronunciation: [ʐɛˈxɔvɔ ˈɡat͡ɕ]) is a village in the administrative district of Gmina Sypniewo, within Maków County, Masovian Voivodeship, in east-central Poland.
