= Chełsty, Masovian Voivodeship =

Chełsty
- Village
- Location within Poland
- Coordinates: 52°55′27″N 21°26′11″E
- Country: Poland
- Voivodeship: Masovian
- County: Maków
- Gmina: Różan

Chełsty [ˈxɛu̯stɨ] is a village in the administrative district of Gmina Różan, within Maków County, Masovian Voivodeship, in east-central Poland.
