= Brzóze Małe =

- Village
- Location within Poland
- Coordinates: 52°48′42″N 21°27′47″E
- Country: Poland
- Voivodeship: Masovian
- County: Maków
- Gmina: Rzewnie

Brzóze Małe [ˈbʐuzɛ ˈmawɛ] is a village in the administrative district of Gmina Rzewnie, within Maków County, Masovian Voivodeship, in east-central Poland.
