= Retka =

- Village
- Location within Poland
- Coordinates: 52°57′N 21°4′E
- Country: Poland
- Voivodeship: Masovian
- County: Maków
- Gmina: Płoniawy-Bramura

Retka [ˈrɛtka] is a village in the administrative district of Gmina Płoniawy-Bramura, within Maków County, Masovian Voivodeship, in east-central Poland.
