= Batogowo =

- Village
- Location within Poland
- Coordinates: 52°58′30″N 21°18′45″E
- Country: Poland
- Voivodeship: Masovian
- County: Maków
- Gmina: Sypniewo

Batogowo [batɔˈɡɔvɔ] is a village in the administrative district of Gmina Sypniewo, within Maków County, Masovian Voivodeship, in east-central Poland.

== Monuments ==
- Wayside shrine of 19th century.
