= Gołoniwy =

Village in Gmina Płoniawy-Bramura, Poland

- Village
- Location within Poland
- Coordinates: 52°57′17″N 21°09′26″E
- Country: Poland
- Voivodeship: Masovian
- County: Maków
- Gmina: Płoniawy-Bramura

Gołoniwy [ɡɔwɔˈnivɨ] is a village in the administrative district of Gmina Płoniawy-Bramura, within Maków County, Masovian Voivodeship, in east-central Poland.
