= Chełchy Iłowe =

- Village
- Location within Poland
- Coordinates: 52°53′N 20°57′E
- Country: Poland
- Voivodeship: Masovian
- County: Maków
- Gmina: Karniewo

Chełchy Iłowe [ˈxɛu̯xɨ iˈwɔvɛ] is a village in the administrative district of Gmina Karniewo, within Maków County, Masovian Voivodeship, in east-central Poland.
