= Załęże Wielkie =

Village in Masovian Voivodeship, Poland

- Village
- Location within Poland
- Coordinates: 52°56′N 21°23′E
- Country: Poland
- Voivodeship: Masovian
- County: Maków
- Gmina: Różan

Załęże Wielkie [zaˈwɛ̃ʐɛ ˈvjɛlkʲɛ] is a village in the administrative district of Gmina Różan, within Maków County, Masovian Voivodeship, in east-central Poland.
