= Sławkowo, Maków County =

Sławkowo
- Village
- Location within Poland
- Coordinates: 52°59′N 21°18′E
- Country: Poland
- Voivodeship: Masovian
- County: Maków
- Gmina: Sypniewo
- Time zone: UTC+1 (CET)
  - Summer (DST): UTC+2 (CEST)

Sławkowo [swafˈkɔvɔ] is a village in the administrative district of Gmina Sypniewo, within Maków County, Masovian Voivodeship, in east-central Poland.

Nine Polish citizens were murdered by Nazi Germany in the village during World War II.
