= Stary Sielc =

- Village
- Location within Poland
- Coordinates: 52°47′N 21°16′E
- Country: Poland
- Voivodeship: Masovian
- County: Maków
- Gmina: Rzewnie
- Population: 137

Stary Sielc [ˈstarɨ ˈɕɛlt͡s] is a village in the administrative district of Gmina Rzewnie, within Maków County, Masovian Voivodeship, in east-central Poland.
