= Elżbiecin, Gmina Krasnosielc =

Elżbiecin
- Village
- Location within Poland
- Coordinates: 53°6′N 21°10′E
- Country: Poland
- Voivodeship: Masovian
- County: Maków
- Gmina: Krasnosielc

Elżbiecin [ɛlʐˈbjɛt͡ɕin] is a village in the administrative district of Gmina Krasnosielc, within Maków County, Masovian Voivodeship, in east-central Poland.
