= Dąbrówka, Gmina Czerwonka =

Dąbrówka
- Village
- Location within Poland
- Coordinates: 52°54′40″N 21°12′25″E
- Country: Poland
- Voivodeship: Masovian
- County: Maków
- Gmina: Czerwonka
- Population: 500

Dąbrówka [dɔmˈbrufka] is a village in the administrative district of Gmina Czerwonka, within Maków County, Masovian Voivodeship, in east-central Poland.
