= Chełchy Kmiece =

Village in Gmina Karniewo, Poland

- Village
- Location within Poland
- Coordinates: 52°51′46″N 21°00′19″E
- Country: Poland
- Voivodeship: Masovian
- County: Maków
- Gmina: Karniewo

Chełchy Kmiece [ˈxɛu̯xɨ ˈkmjɛt͡sɛ] is a village in the administrative district of Gmina Karniewo, within Maków County, Masovian Voivodeship, in east-central Poland.
