= Chełchy, Masovian Voivodeship =

Chełchy
- Village
- Location within Poland
- Coordinates: 53°2′N 21°20′E
- Country: Poland
- Voivodeship: Masovian
- County: Maków
- Gmina: Sypniewo

Chełchy [ˈxɛu̯xɨ] is a village in the administrative district of Gmina Sypniewo, within Maków County, Masovian Voivodeship, in east-central Poland.
