= Łachy Włościańskie =

- Village
- Location within Poland
- Coordinates: 52°48′N 21°24′E
- Country: Poland
- Voivodeship: Masovian
- County: Maków
- Gmina: Rzewnie

Łachy Włościańskie (Polish pronunciation: [ˈwaxɨ vwɔɕˈtɕaj̃skʲɛ]) is a village in the administrative district of Gmina Rzewnie, within Maków County, Masovian Voivodeship, in east-central Poland.
