= Zamość, Maków County =

Zamość
- Village
- Location within Poland
- Coordinates: 52°59′N 21°15′E
- Country: Poland
- Voivodeship: Masovian
- County: Maków
- Gmina: Sypniewo

Zamość (Polish pronunciation: [ˈzamɔɕt͡ɕ]) is a village in the administrative district of Gmina Sypniewo, within Maków County, Masovian Voivodeship, in east-central Poland.
