= Szwelice =

- Village
- Location within Poland
- Coordinates: 52°48′N 21°2′E
- Country: Poland
- Voivodeship: Masovian
- County: Maków
- Gmina: Karniewo

Szwelice [ʂfɛˈlit͡sɛ] is a village in the administrative district of Gmina Karniewo, within Maków County, Masovian Voivodeship, in east-central Poland.
