= Adamowo, Maków County =

Adamowo
- Village
- Location within Poland
- Coordinates: 52°50′3″N 21°11′51″E
- Country: Poland
- Voivodeship: Masovian
- County: Maków
- Gmina: Czerwonka

Adamowo [adaˈmɔvɔ] is a village in the administrative district of Gmina Czerwonka, within Maków County, Masovian Voivodeship, in east-central Poland.
