= Jaciążek =

- Village
- Location within Poland
- Coordinates: 52°57′N 21°4′E
- Country: Poland
- Voivodeship: Masovian
- County: Maków
- Gmina: Płoniawy-Bramura

Population
  - Total: 305 (2,011)
- Time zone: UTC+1 (CET)
  - Summer (DST): UTC+2 (CEST)
- Postal code: 06-210
- Vehicle registration: WMA

Jaciążek [jaˈt͡ɕɔ̃ʐɛk] is a village in the administrative district of Gmina Płoniawy-Bramura, within Maków County, Masovian Voivodeship, in north-central Poland.

== History ==
During the German occupation in World War II, in August 1943, the occupiers established a forced labour camp for Poles and Jews in the village. Many prisoners died to typhus and dysentery. It was dissolved in March 1944, and the prisoners were sent to other camps.
