= Płoniawy-Kolonia =

- Village
- Location within Poland
- Coordinates: 52°59′02″N 21°03′15″E
- Country: Poland
- Voivodeship: Masovian
- County: Maków
- Gmina: Płoniawy-Bramura

Płoniawy-Kolonia [pwɔˈɲavɨ kɔˈlɔɲa] is a village in the administrative district of Gmina Płoniawy-Bramura, within Maków County, Masovian Voivodeship, in east-central Poland.
