= Zelki Dąbrowe =

- Village
- Location within Poland
- Coordinates: 52°50′N 21°3′E
- Country: Poland
- Voivodeship: Masovian
- County: Maków
- Gmina: Karniewo

Zelki Dąbrowe [ˈzɛlki dɔmˈbrɔvɛ] is a village in the administrative district of Gmina Karniewo, within Maków County, Masovian Voivodeship, in east-central Poland.
