= Wólka Drążdżewska =

- Village
- Location within Poland
- Coordinates: 53°05′45″N 21°08′30″E
- Country: Poland
- Voivodeship: Masovian
- County: Maków
- Gmina: Krasnosielc

Wólka Drążdżewska [ˈvulka drɔ̃ʐˈd͡ʐɛfska] is a village in the administrative district of Gmina Krasnosielc, within Maków County, Masovian Voivodeship, in east-central Poland.
