= Czarnostów-Polesie =

Village in Gmina Karniewo, Poland

- Village
- Location within Poland
- Coordinates: 52°48′40″N 21°01′22″E
- Country: Poland
- Voivodeship: Masovian
- County: Maków
- Gmina: Karniewo

Czarnostów-Polesie [t͡ʂarˈnɔstuf pɔˈlɛɕɛ] is a village in the administrative district of Gmina Karniewo, within Maków County, Masovian Voivodeship, in east-central Poland.
