= Repnin Sejm =

Polish parliament, 1767–1768

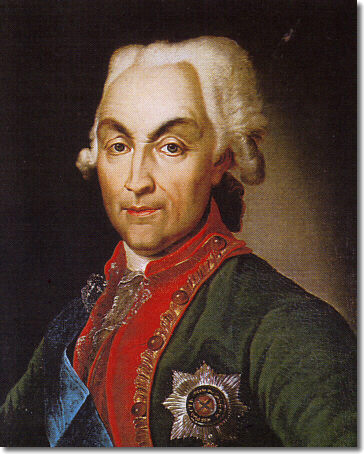
Nikolai Repnin, the Russian ambassador who orchestrated the proceedings of the Sejm

The Repnin Sejm (Polish: Sejm repninowski) was a sejm (parliament) of the Polish–Lithuanian Commonwealth that was held between 1767 and 1768 in Warsaw. This sejm followed the Sejms of 1764 to 1766, where the newly elected King of Poland, Stanisław August Poniatowski, attempted with some successes to push through reforms to strengthen the government of the Commonwealth. These reforms were viewed as dangerous by Poland's neighbors, who preferred a weak Commonwealth and did not want to see it threaten their own political and military aspirations. The Russian Empire sent ambassador Nikolai Repnin, who became the driving force behind the Sejm proceedings. The Repnin Sejm marked one of the important milestones in increasing Polish dependence on the Russian Empire, and turning it into a Russian protectorate. This dependent position was bluntly spelled out in Nikita Panin's letter to King Poniatowski, in which he made it clear that Poland was now in the Russian sphere of influence.

== History ==
The Ambassador of the Russian Empire to Warsaw Prince Nikolai Repnin received orders from Russian Empress Catherine the Great to bribe and coerce the Sejm deputies in order to push legislation favourable to Russia, in effect "a carefully drafted plan for destroying the republic". At that time Poland had a population of about 11.5 million, out of which about 1 million were non-Catholics. In his preparations Repnin fostered unrest among the religious minorities – Protestants (mostly in Royal Prussia and Greater Poland) and Eastern Orthodox (mostly in the Grand Duchy of Lithuania), who wanted to have equal rights with the Roman Catholics. Repnin was well aware that a Catholic-dominated Sejm would be strongly opposed to such demands. He also calculated that such a demand itself would make the szlachta suspicious of all reform, including the recent reforms of King Stanisław August Poniatowski and his supporters from the magnate Czartoryski family. Repnin's calculations were proven correct at the Sejm of 1766, which not only rejected the dissident bill, but repealed all of Poniatowski's reforms. This weakened the position of King Poniatowski. Supporters of the previous King Augustus III of Poland from the Electorate of Saxony, led by Gabriel Podoski, started a campaign to dethrone the king.

In order to further Russian goals, Repnin encouraged the formation of two Protestant konfederacjas of Słuck and Toruń and later, Catholic (Radom Confederation, led by Karol Stanisław "Panie Kochanku" Radziwiłł). The first act of the Radom Confederation was to send a delegation to Saint Petersburg, petitioning Catherine to guarantee the liberties of the Republic, and allow the proper legislation to be settled by the Russian ambassador at Warsaw. With Russian troops sent to "protect" the various pro-Russian factions and this carte blanche in his pocket, Repnin proceeded to treat the deputies of the Sejm as if they were already servants of the Russian empress.

The opposition was headed by four bishops: Bishop of Lwów Wacław Hieronim Sierakowski (1699–1784), Bishop of Chełm Feliks Turski (1729–1800), Bishop of Cracow Kajetan Sołtyk (1715–1788), and Bishop of Kiev Józef Andrzej Załuski (1702–1774). To break the opposition, Repnin ordered the arrest of four vocal opponents of his policies in the Polish capital, namely bishops Józef Andrzej Załuski and Kajetan Sołtyk and hetman Wacław Rzewuski with his son Seweryn. All of them members of the Senate of Poland, they were arrested by Russian troops on October 13, 1767 and imprisoned in Kaluga for 5 years.

Through the Polish nobles that he bribed (like Gabriel Podoski, Primate of Poland) or threatened by the presence of over 10,000 Russian soldiers in Warsaw and even in the very chambers of the parliament, Repnin, despite some misgivings about the methods he was ordered to employ, de facto dictated the terms of that Sejm. The intimidated Sejm, which met in October 1767 and adjourned till February 1768, appointed a commission (the so-called Delegated Sejm) which drafted a Polish–Russian treaty, approved in a "silent session" (without debate) on February 27, 1768. The legislation undid some of the reforms of 1764 under King Poniatowski and pushed through legislation which ensured that the political system of the Commonwealth would be ineffective and easily controlled by its foreign neighbours. The liberum veto, wolna elekcja (free election), neminem captivabimus, rights to form the confederation and rokosz — in other words, all the important privileges of the Golden Liberty, which made the Commonwealth so ungovernable — were guaranteed as unalterable parts in the Cardinal Laws.

The Sejm, however, also passed some more beneficial reforms. Russia, which had used the pretext of increased religious freedoms for the Protestant and Orthodox Christians to destabilize the Commonwealth in the first place, now had to push those reforms through the Sejm to save face. Thus, the legislation of the Sejm granted those religious minorities the same status as that of the previously dominant Roman Catholics, and some privileges of the Catholic clergy were limited. In addition, the penalty for killing a peasant was increased from a fine to the death, liberum veto was abolished on sejmiks (local parliaments), and a mint was created. All those reforms were guaranteed by the Russian Empress, Catherine II. The resulting reaction among Poland's Roman Catholic leadership to the laws granting privileges to the Protestants, as well as the deep resentment of Russia's meddling in the Commonwealth's domestic affairs, led to the War of the Bar Confederation (1768–1772), directed against Poniatowski and Russia, which ended with Russian victory and the First Partition of Poland.
