= Mamino =

- Village
- Location within Poland
- Coordinates: 53°3′N 21°19′E
- Country: Poland
- Voivodeship: Masovian
- County: Maków
- Gmina: Sypniewo
- Population: 395

Mamino [maˈminɔ] is a village in the administrative district of Gmina Sypniewo, within Maków County, Masovian Voivodeship, in east-central Poland.
