= Obiecanowo, Masovian Voivodeship =

Obiecanowo
- Village
- Location within Poland
- Coordinates: 52°54′N 21°5′E
- Country: Poland
- Voivodeship: Masovian
- County: Maków
- Gmina: Karniewo

Obiecanowo [ɔbjɛt͡saˈnɔvɔ] is a village in the administrative district of Gmina Karniewo, within Maków County, Masovian Voivodeship, in east-central Poland.
