= Suche =

Suche may refer to the following places:

- Suché, a village and municipality in Slovakia
- Suche, Lesser Poland Voivodeship (south Poland)
- Suche, Masovian Voivodeship (east-central Poland)
