= Wymysły, Maków County =

Wymysły
- Village
- Location within Poland
- Coordinates: 53°01′48″N 21°10′22″E
- Country: Poland
- Voivodeship: Masovian
- County: Maków
- Gmina: Krasnosielc

Wymysły [vɨˈmɨswɨ] is a village in the administrative district of Gmina Krasnosielc, within Maków County, Masovian Voivodeship, in east-central Poland.
