= Jankowo, Masovian Voivodeship =

Jankowo
- Village
- Location within Poland
- Coordinates: 52°53′N 21°7′E
- Country: Poland
- Voivodeship: Masovian
- County: Maków
- Gmina: Czerwonka

Jankowo [janˈkɔvɔ] is a village in the administrative district of Gmina Czerwonka, within Maków County, Masovian Voivodeship, in east-central Poland.
