= Leśniewo, Maków County =

Leśniewo
- Village
- Location within Poland
- Coordinates: 52°51′N 20°57′E
- Country: Poland
- Voivodeship: Masovian
- County: Maków
- Gmina: Karniewo
- Time zone: UTC+1 (CET)
  - Summer (DST): UTC+2 (CEST)
- Postal code: 06-425
- Vehicle registration: WMA

Leśniewo [lɛɕˈɲɛvɔ] is a village in the administrative district of Gmina Karniewo, within Maków County, Masovian Voivodeship, in north-central Poland.

== History ==
During the German occupation in World War II, the occupiers operated a forced labour camp for Poles and Jews in the village from April 1942 to April 1943.
