= Rutki, Masovian Voivodeship =

Rutki
- Village
- Location within Poland
- Coordinates: 52°51′40″N 20°56′28″E
- Country: Poland
- Voivodeship: Masovian
- County: Maków
- Gmina: Karniewo

Rutki [ˈrutki] is a village in the administrative district of Gmina Karniewo, within Maków County, Masovian Voivodeship, in east-central Poland.
