= Żabin Łukowski =

- Village
- Location within Poland
- Coordinates: 52°50′00″N 20°53′40″E
- Country: Poland
- Voivodeship: Masovian
- County: Maków
- Gmina: Karniewo

Żabin Łukowski [ˈʐabin wuˈkɔfski] is a village in the administrative district of Gmina Karniewo, within Maków County, Masovian Voivodeship, in east-central Poland.
