= Bagienice Szlacheckie =

- Village
- Location within Poland
- Coordinates: 53°3′N 21°12′E
- Country: Poland
- Voivodeship: Masovian
- County: Maków
- Gmina: Krasnosielc

Bagienice Szlacheckie (Polish pronunciation: [baɡʲɛˈɲitsɛ ʂlaˈxɛtskʲɛ]) is a village in the administrative district of Gmina Krasnosielc, within Maków County, Masovian Voivodeship, in east-central Poland.
