= Nowa Zblicha =

- Village
- Location within Poland
- Coordinates: 52°59′24″N 21°02′29″E
- Country: Poland
- Voivodeship: Masovian
- County: Maków
- Gmina: Płoniawy-Bramura

Nowa Zblicha [ˈnɔva ˈzblixa] is a village in the administrative district of Gmina Płoniawy-Bramura, within Maków County, Masovian Voivodeship, in east-central Poland.
