= Glinki-Rafały =

- Village
- Location within Poland
- Coordinates: 53°1′26″N 21°19′24″E
- Country: Poland
- Voivodeship: Masovian
- County: Maków
- Gmina: Sypniewo
- Population: 120

Glinki-Rafały [ˈɡlinki raˈfawɨ] is a village in the administrative district of Gmina Sypniewo, within Maków County, Masovian Voivodeship, in east-central Poland.
