= Mroczki-Kawki =

- Village
- Location within Poland
- Coordinates: 52°49′27″N 21°25′16″E
- Country: Poland
- Voivodeship: Masovian
- County: Maków
- Gmina: Rzewnie

Mroczki-Kawki (Polish pronunciation: [ˈmrɔt͡ʂkʲi ˈkafkʲi]) is a village in the administrative district of Gmina Rzewnie, within Maków County, Masovian Voivodeship, in east-central Poland.

From 1975-1998 the town was administered as a part of Ostrołęka County.
