= Krzyżewo-Jurki =

- Village
- Location within Poland
- Coordinates: 52°55′50″N 21°10′24″E
- Country: Poland
- Voivodeship: Masovian
- County: Maków
- Gmina: Czerwonka

Krzyżewo-Jurki [kʂɨˈʐɛvɔ ˈjurki] is a village in the administrative district of Gmina Czerwonka, within Maków County, Masovian Voivodeship, in east-central Poland.

== See also ==
- Krzyżewski
