= Szlasy Bure =

- Village
- Location within Poland
- Coordinates: 52°56′14″N 21°00′00″E
- Country: Poland
- Voivodeship: Masovian
- County: Maków
- Gmina: Płoniawy-Bramura

Szlasy Bure (Polish pronunciation: [ˈʂlasɨ ˈburɛ]) is a village in the administrative district of Gmina Płoniawy-Bramura, within Maków County, Masovian Voivodeship, in east-central Poland.
