= Krzemień, Maków County =

Krzemień
- Village
- Location within Poland
- Coordinates: 52°47′55″N 20°58′23″E
- Country: Poland
- Voivodeship: Masovian
- County: Maków
- Gmina: Karniewo

Krzemień [ˈkʂɛmjɛɲ] is a village in the administrative district of Gmina Karniewo, within Maków County, Masovian Voivodeship, in east-central Poland.
