= Gabriel Podoski =

Polish noble and archbishop

His Excellency Mikolaj Prazmowski
- Archdiocese of Gniezno
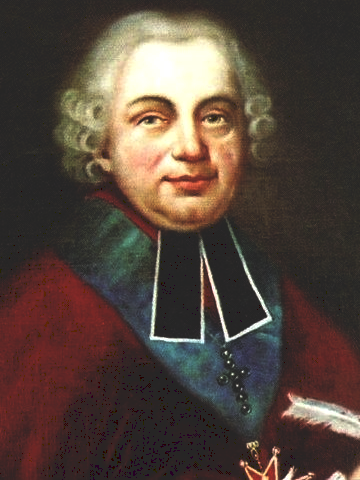
- Church: Roman Catholic
- Archdiocese: Gniezno

Personal details
- Born: 17 March 1718 Stary Podoś
- Died: 3 April 1777 (aged 59) Marseille
- Coat of arms

Gabriel Podoski was one of the Polish nobles in Russian service and supported their position. He was one of the leaders of the Radom Confederation, a supporter of the cardinal laws and a supporter of August III of Poland, opponent of king Stanisław August Poniatowski.

Preceded by Władysław Aleksander Łubieński	Archbishop of Gniezno; Primate of Poland; 1767–1777	Succeeded by Antoni Kazimierz Ostrowski
