= Nowy Sielc, Gmina Rzewnie =

Nowy Sielc
- Village
- Location within Poland
- Coordinates: 52°48′27″N 21°17′36″E
- Country: Poland
- Voivodeship: Masovian
- County: Maków
- Gmina: Rzewnie

Nowy Sielc [ˈnɔvɨ ˈɕɛlt͡s] is a village in the administrative district of Gmina Rzewnie, within Maków County, Masovian Voivodeship, in east-central Poland.
