= Strzemieczne-Sędki =

- Village
- Location within Poland
- Coordinates: 53°00′41″N 21°23′05″E
- Country: Poland
- Voivodeship: Masovian
- County: Maków
- Gmina: Sypniewo

Strzemieczne-Sędki [stʂɛˈmjɛt͡ʂnɛ ˈsɛntki] is a village in the administrative district of Gmina Sypniewo, within Maków County, Masovian Voivodeship, in east-central Poland.
