= Rzechówek =

- Village
- Location within Poland
- Coordinates: 52°57′01″N 21°14′58″E
- Country: Poland
- Voivodeship: Masovian
- County: Maków
- Gmina: Sypniewo

Rzechówek [ʐɛˈxuvɛk] is a village in the administrative district of Gmina Sypniewo, within Maków County, Masovian Voivodeship, in east-central Poland.
