= Bagienice-Folwark =

- Village
- Location within Poland
- Coordinates: 53°3′55″N 21°11′5″E
- Country: Poland
- Voivodeship: Masovian
- County: Maków
- Gmina: Krasnosielc

Bagienice-Folwark (Polish pronunciation: [baɡʲɛˈɲitsɛ ˈfɔlvark]) is a village in the administrative district of Gmina Krasnosielc, within Maków County, Masovian Voivodeship, in east-central Poland.
