= Bobino Wielkie =

- Village
- Location within Poland
- Coordinates: 53°02′20″N 21°03′58″E
- Country: Poland
- Voivodeship: Masovian
- County: Maków
- Gmina: Płoniawy-Bramura

Bobino Wielkie [bɔˈbinɔ ˈvjɛlkʲɛ] is a village in the administrative district of Gmina Płoniawy-Bramura, within Maków County, Masovian Voivodeship, in east-central Poland.
