= Prace, Poland =

Prace
- Village
- Location within Poland
- Coordinates: 53°0′18″N 21°0′56″E
- Country: Poland
- Voivodeship: Masovian
- County: Maków
- Gmina: Płoniawy-Bramura

Prace [ˈprat͡sɛ] is a village in the administrative district of Gmina Płoniawy-Bramura, within Maków County, Masovian Voivodeship, in east-central Poland.
