= Orłowo, Maków County =

Village in Gmina Rzewnie, Poland

Orłowo
- Village
- Location within Poland
- Coordinates: 52°47′41″N 21°22′41″E
- Country: Poland
- Voivodeship: Masovian
- County: Maków
- Gmina: Rzewnie

Orłowo [ɔrˈwɔvɔ] is a village in the administrative district of Gmina Rzewnie, within Maków County, Masovian Voivodeship, in east-central Poland.
