= Biedrzyce-Stara Wieś =

Village in Gmina Sypniewo, Poland

- Village
- Location within Poland
- Coordinates: 52°57′32″N 21°16′24″E
- Country: Poland
- Voivodeship: Masovian
- County: Maków
- Gmina: Sypniewo

Biedrzyce-Stara Wieś [bjɛˈdʐɨt͡sɛ ˈstara ˈvjɛɕ] is a village in the administrative district of Gmina Sypniewo, within Maków County, Masovian Voivodeship, in east-central Poland.
