= Milewo-Wypychy =

- Village
- Location within Poland
- Coordinates: 52°52′54″N 20°54′17″E
- Country: Poland
- Voivodeship: Masovian
- County: Maków
- Gmina: Karniewo

Milewo-Wypychy [miˈlɛvɔ vɨˈpɨxɨ] is a village in the administrative district of Gmina Karniewo, within Maków County, Masovian Voivodeship, in east-central Poland.
