= Grabowo, Maków County =

Grabowo
- Village
- Location within Poland
- Coordinates: 53°05′02″N 21°13′04″E
- Country: Poland
- Voivodeship: Masovian
- County: Maków
- Gmina: Krasnosielc
- Time zone: UTC+1 (CET)
  - Summer (DST): UTC+2 (CEST)

Grabowo [ɡraˈbɔvɔ] is a village in the administrative district of Gmina Krasnosielc, within Maków County, Masovian Voivodeship, in east-central Poland.

Eight Polish citizens were murdered by Nazi Germany in the village during World War II.
