= Bobino-Grzybki =

- Village
- Location within Poland
- Coordinates: 53°2′41″N 21°2′26″E
- Country: Poland
- Voivodeship: Masovian
- County: Maków
- Gmina: Płoniawy-Bramura

Bobino-Grzybki [bɔˈbinɔ ˈɡʐɨpki] is a village in the administrative district of Gmina Płoniawy-Bramura, within Maków County, Masovian Voivodeship, in east-central Poland.
