= Załęże-Sędzięta =

- Village
- Location within Poland
- Coordinates: 52°56′45″N 21°20′50″E
- Country: Poland
- Voivodeship: Masovian
- County: Maków
- Gmina: Różan

Załęże-Sędzięta [zaˈwɛ̃ʐɛ sɛnˈd͡ʑɛnta] is a village in the administrative district of Gmina Różan, within Maków County, Masovian Voivodeship, in east-central Poland.
