= Ziemaki, Masovian Voivodeship =

Ziemaki
- Village
- Location within Poland
- Coordinates: 53°00′11″N 21°21′00″E
- Country: Poland
- Voivodeship: Masovian
- County: Maków
- Gmina: Sypniewo

Ziemaki [ʑɛˈmaki] is a village in the administrative district of Gmina Sypniewo, within Maków County, Masovian Voivodeship, in east-central Poland.
