= Napiórki Butne =

Village in Gmina Rzewnie, Poland

- Village
- Location within Poland
- Coordinates: 52°49′37″N 21°24′13″E
- Country: Poland
- Voivodeship: Masovian
- County: Maków
- Gmina: Rzewnie

Napiórki Butne [naˈpjurki ˈbutnɛ] is a village in the administrative district of Gmina Rzewnie, within Maków County, Masovian Voivodeship, in east-central Poland.
