= Drozdowo, Maków County =

Drozdowo
- Village
- Location within Poland
- Coordinates: 52°47′58″N 21°27′09″E
- Country: Poland
- Voivodeship: Masovian
- County: Maków
- Gmina: Rzewnie

Drozdowo [drɔzˈdɔvɔ] is a village in the administrative district of Gmina Rzewnie, within Maków County, Masovian Voivodeship, in east-central Poland.
