= Cieciórki Włościańskie =

- Village
- Location within Poland
- Coordinates: 52°55′17″N 21°10′46″E
- Country: Poland
- Voivodeship: Masovian
- County: Maków
- Gmina: Czerwonka
- Population: 40

Cieciórki Włościańskie (Polish pronunciation: [tɕɛˈtɕurkʲi vwɔɕˈtɕaj̃skʲɛ]) is a village in the administrative district of Gmina Czerwonka, within Maków County, Masovian Voivodeship, in east-central Poland.
