= Kałęczyn, Maków County =

Kałęczyn
- Village
- Location within Poland
- Coordinates: 52°56′30″N 21°10′50″E
- Country: Poland
- Voivodeship: Masovian
- County: Maków
- Gmina: Czerwonka

Kałęczyn [kaˈwɛnt͡ʂɨn] is a village in the administrative district of Gmina Czerwonka, within Maków County, Masovian Voivodeship, in east-central Poland.
