= Zawady-Huta =

- Village
- Location within Poland
- Coordinates: 52°59′12″N 21°08′58″E
- Country: Poland
- Voivodeship: Masovian
- County: Maków
- Gmina: Płoniawy-Bramura

Zawady-Huta [zaˈvadɨ ˈxuta] is a village in the administrative district of Gmina Płoniawy-Bramura, within Maków County, Masovian Voivodeship, in east-central Poland.
