= Malki =

Malki may refer to:

== People ==
=== Surname ===
- Adnan al-Malki (1918–1955), Syrian Army officer
- David Malki, writer of Wondermark webcomic
- El Mehdi Malki (born 1988), Moroccan judoka at the 2012 Olympics
- Ezra Malki (1918–1955), Greek rabbi
- George Malki (born 1992), American soccer player, has mostly played for US clubs
- Reema Al-Malki (born 1998), Saudi footballer
- Sanharib Malki (born 1984), Assyrian footballer, has mostly played for Belgian clubs

== Places ==
- Malki Bulgareni, Dryanovo Municipality, Gabrovo Province, Bulgaria
- Małki, Kuyavian-Pomeranian Voivodeship, Poland
- Małki, Masovian Voivodeship, Poland
- Malki, Kamchatka Krai, Russia
- Morongo Indian Reservation, originally named Malki
  - Malki Museum, on the reservation

== Other ==
- Malki Foundation, an Israeli charity supporting families with disabled children
