= Kaszewiec =

- Village
- Location within Poland
- Coordinates: 52°52′43″N 21°25′40″E
- Country: Poland
- Voivodeship: Masovian
- County: Maków
- Gmina: Różan
- Population: 53

Kaszewiec [kaˈʂɛvjɛt͡s] is a village in the administrative district of Gmina Różan, within Maków County, Masovian Voivodeship, in east-central Poland.
