= Prycanowo =

- Village
- Location within Poland
- Coordinates: 52°53′44″N 21°21′47″E
- Country: Poland
- Voivodeship: Masovian
- County: Maków
- Gmina: Różan

Prycanowo [prɨt͡saˈnɔvɔ] is a village in the administrative district of Gmina Różan, within Maków County, Masovian Voivodeship, in east-central Poland.
