= Zalesie, Gmina Sypniewo =

Zalesie
- Village
- Location within Poland
- Coordinates: 52°57′10″N 21°12′28″E
- Country: Poland
- Voivodeship: Masovian
- County: Maków
- Gmina: Sypniewo
- Postal code: 06-213

Zalesie [zaˈlɛɕɛ] is a village in the administrative district of Gmina Sypniewo, within Maków County, Masovian Voivodeship, in east-central Poland.
