= Nowe Łachy =

Village in Gmina Rzewnie, Poland

- Village
- Location within Poland
- Coordinates: 52°47′39″N 21°23′53″E
- Country: Poland
- Voivodeship: Masovian
- County: Maków
- Gmina: Rzewnie

Nowe Łachy [ˈnɔvɛ ˈwaxɨ] is a village in the administrative district of Gmina Rzewnie, within Maków County, Masovian Voivodeship, in east-central Poland.
