= Podborze, Maków County =

Podborze
- Village
- Location within Poland
- Coordinates: 52°54′N 21°21′E
- Country: Poland
- Voivodeship: Masovian
- County: Maków
- Gmina: Różan

Podborze [pɔdˈbɔʐɛ] is a village in the administrative district of Gmina Różan, within Maków County, Masovian Voivodeship, in east-central Poland.
