= Perzanki-Borek =

- Village
- Location within Poland
- Coordinates: 53°05′25″N 21°12′47″E
- Country: Poland
- Voivodeship: Masovian
- County: Maków
- Gmina: Krasnosielc
- Population: 32

Perzanki-Borek [pɛˈʐaŋki ˈbɔrɛk] is a village in the administrative district of Gmina Krasnosielc, within Maków County, Masovian Voivodeship, in east-central Poland.
