= Dąbrówka, Gmina Rzewnie =

Village in Gmina Rzewnie, Poland

Dąbrówka
- Village
- Location within Poland
- Coordinates: 52°48′43″N 21°18′40″E
- Country: Poland
- Voivodeship: Masovian
- County: Maków
- Gmina: Rzewnie

Dąbrówka [dɔmˈbrufka] is a village in the administrative district of Gmina Rzewnie, within Maków County, Masovian Voivodeship, in east-central Poland.
