= Zawady-Ponikiew =

- Village
- Location within Poland
- Coordinates: 52°54′14″N 21°19′5″E
- Country: Poland
- Voivodeship: Masovian
- County: Maków
- Gmina: Różan
- Population: 34

Zawady-Ponikiew [zaˈvadɨ pɔˈnikʲɛf] is a village in the administrative district of Gmina Różan, within Maków County, Masovian Voivodeship, in east-central Poland.
