= Wola Włościańska =

- Village
- Location within Poland
- Coordinates: 52°59′48″N 21°10′51″E
- Country: Poland
- Voivodeship: Masovian
- County: Maków
- Gmina: Krasnosielc

Wola Włościańska (Polish pronunciation: [ˈvɔla vwɔɕˈtɕaj̃ska]) is a village in the administrative district of Gmina Krasnosielc, within Maków County, Masovian Voivodeship, in east-central Poland.
