= Drążdżewo Małe =

- Village
- Location within Poland
- Coordinates: 53°04′15″N 21°08′11″E
- Country: Poland
- Voivodeship: Masovian
- County: Maków
- Gmina: Krasnosielc

Drążdżewo Małe [drɔ̃ʐˈd͡ʐɛvɔ ˈmawɛ] is a village in the administrative district of Gmina Krasnosielc, in Maków County, Masovian Voivodeship, in east-central Poland.
