= Mariampole =

- Village
- Location within Poland
- Coordinates: 52°54′1″N 21°16′36″E
- Country: Poland
- Voivodeship: Masovian
- County: Maków
- Gmina: Czerwonka

Mariampole [marjamˈpɔlɛ] is a village in the administrative district of Gmina Czerwonka, within Maków County, Masovian Voivodeship, in east-central Poland.
