= Nowy Sielc, Gmina Krasnosielc =

Nowy Sielc
- Village
- Location within Poland
- Coordinates: 53°01′23″N 21°09′21″E
- Country: Poland
- Voivodeship: Masovian
- County: Maków
- Gmina: Krasnosielc

Nowy Sielc [ˈnɔvɨ ˈɕɛlt͡s] is a village in the administrative district of Gmina Krasnosielc, within Maków County, Masovian Voivodeship, in east-central Poland.
