= Kobylin, Maków County =

Kobylin
- Village
- Location within Poland
- Coordinates: 52°56′N 21°5′E
- Country: Poland
- Voivodeship: Masovian
- County: Maków
- Gmina: Płoniawy-Bramura

Kobylin [kɔˈbɨlin] is a village in the administrative district of Gmina Płoniawy-Bramura, within Maków County, Masovian Voivodeship, in east-central Poland.
