= Żabin Karniewski =

- Village
- Location within Poland
- Coordinates: 52°50′31″N 21°01′39″E
- Country: Poland
- Voivodeship: Masovian
- County: Maków
- Gmina: Karniewo

Żabin Karniewski [ˈʐabin karˈɲɛfski] is a village in the administrative district of Gmina Karniewo, within Maków County, Masovian Voivodeship, in east-central Poland.
