= Biedrzyce-Koziegłowy =

- Village
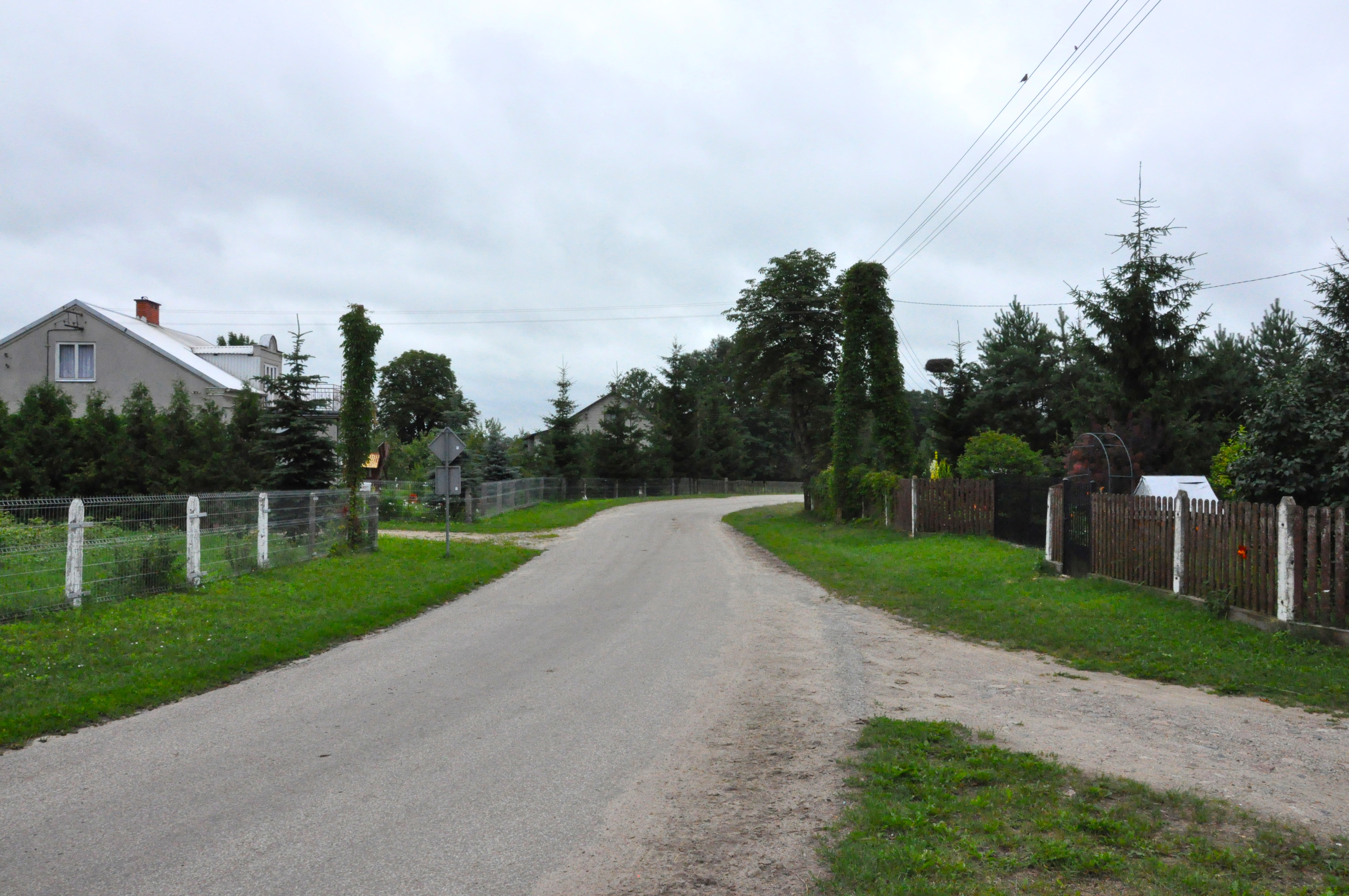

- Location within Poland
- Coordinates: 52°58′7″N 21°17′29″E
- Country: Poland
- Voivodeship: Masovian
- County: Maków
- Gmina: Sypniewo
- Time zone: UTC+1 (CET)
  - Summer (DST): UTC+2 (CEST)
- Postal code: 06-213
- Vehicle registration: WMA

Biedrzyce-Koziegłowy [bjɛˈdʐɨt͡sɛ kɔʑɛˈɡwɔvɨ] is a village in the administrative district of Gmina Sypniewo, within Maków County, Masovian Voivodeship, in east-central Poland.

== History ==
During the German occupation in World War II, the occupiers operated a forced labour camp for Poles and Jews in the village from October 1941 to May 1942.
