= Łukowo, Masovian Voivodeship =

Łukowo
- Village
- Location within Poland
- Coordinates: 52°51′04″N 20°54′18″E
- Country: Poland
- Voivodeship: Masovian
- County: Maków
- Gmina: Karniewo
- Population: 325

Łukowo [wuˈkɔvɔ] is a village in the administrative district of Gmina Karniewo, within Maków County, Masovian Voivodeship, in east-central Poland.
