= Zawady Dworskie, Maków County =

Zawady Dworskie
- Village
- Location within Poland
- Coordinates: 52°58′38″N 21°09′29″E
- Country: Poland
- Voivodeship: Masovian
- County: Maków
- Gmina: Płoniawy-Bramura

Zawady Dworskie [zaˈvadɨ ˈdvɔrskʲɛ] is a village located in the administrative district of Gmina Płoniawy-Bramura, within Maków County, Masovian Voivodeship, in east-central Poland.
