= Chełchy-Chabdzyno =

Village in Gmina Karniewo, Poland

- Village
- Location within Poland
- Coordinates: 52°52′00″N 20°58′52″E
- Country: Poland
- Voivodeship: Masovian
- County: Maków
- Gmina: Karniewo

Chełchy-Chabdzyno [ˈxɛu̯xɨ xabˈd͡zɨnɔ] is a village in the administrative district of Gmina Karniewo, within Maków County, Masovian Voivodeship, in east-central Poland.
