= Popielarka =

- Village
- Location within Poland
- Coordinates: 52°55′N 21°7′E
- Country: Poland
- Voivodeship: Masovian
- County: Maków
- Gmina: Płoniawy-Bramura

Popielarka [pɔpjɛˈlarka] is a village in the administrative district of Gmina Płoniawy-Bramura, within Maków County, Masovian Voivodeship, in east-central Poland.
