= Kalinowiec, Maków County =

Kalinowiec
- Village
- Location within Poland
- Coordinates: 52°56′32″N 21°1′23″E
- Country: Poland
- Voivodeship: Masovian
- County: Maków
- Gmina: Płoniawy-Bramura

Kalinowiec [kaliˈnɔvjɛt͡s] is a village in the administrative district of Gmina Płoniawy-Bramura, within Maków County, Masovian Voivodeship, in east-central Poland.
