= Choszczewka, Maków County =

Village in Gmina Płoniawy-Bramura, Poland

Choszczewka
- Village
- Location within Poland
- Coordinates: 52°58′55″N 21°01′32″E
- Country: Poland
- Voivodeship: Masovian
- County: Maków
- Gmina: Płoniawy-Bramura

Choszczewka [xɔʂˈt͡ʂɛfka] is a village in the administrative district of Gmina Płoniawy-Bramura, within Maków County, Masovian Voivodeship, in east-central Poland.
