= Niesułowo-Pach =

- Village
- Location within Poland
- Coordinates: 53°02′59″N 21°17′16″E
- Country: Poland
- Voivodeship: Masovian
- County: Maków
- Gmina: Krasnosielc

Niesułowo-Pach [ɲɛsuˈwɔvɔ ˈpax] is a village in the administrative district of Gmina Krasnosielc, within Maków County, Masovian Voivodeship, in east-central Poland.
