= Zwierzyniec, Maków County =

Zwierzyniec
- Village
- Location within Poland
- Coordinates: 53°7′N 21°8′E
- Country: Poland
- Voivodeship: Masovian
- County: Maków
- Gmina: Krasnosielc

Zwierzyniec (Polish pronunciation: [zvjɛˈʐɨɲɛt͡s]) is a village in the administrative district of Gmina Krasnosielc, within Maków County, Masovian Voivodeship, in east-central Poland.
