= Stare Glinki =

- Village
- Location within Poland
- Coordinates: 52°59′24″N 21°20′45″E
- Country: Poland
- Voivodeship: Masovian
- County: Maków
- Gmina: Sypniewo
- Population: 70

Stare Glinki [ˈstarɛ ˈɡliŋki] is a village in the administrative district of Gmina Sypniewo, within Maków County, Masovian Voivodeship, in east-central Poland.
