= Krzyżewo Nadrzeczne =

- Village
- Location within Poland
- Coordinates: 52°56′N 21°5′E
- Country: Poland
- Voivodeship: Masovian
- County: Maków
- Gmina: Płoniawy-Bramura

Krzyżewo Nadrzeczne [kʂɨˈʐɛvɔ naˈdʐɛt͡ʂnɛ] is a village in the administrative district of Gmina Płoniawy-Bramura, within Maków County, Masovian Voivodeship, in east-central Poland.

== See also ==
- Krzyżewski
