= Budzyno-Lipniki =

- Village
- Location within Poland
- Coordinates: 52°54′14″N 21°8′55″E
- Country: Poland
- Voivodeship: Masovian
- County: Maków
- Gmina: Czerwonka

Budzyno-Lipniki (Polish pronunciation: [buˈd͡zɨnɔ lipˈɲikʲi]) is a village in the administrative district of Gmina Czerwonka, within Maków County, Masovian Voivodeship, in east-central Poland.
