= Dąbrówka, Gmina Różan =

Village in Gmina Różan, Poland

Dąbrówka
- Village
- Location within Poland
- Coordinates: 52°54′38″N 21°26′57″E
- Country: Poland
- Voivodeship: Masovian
- County: Maków
- Gmina: Różan

Dąbrówka [dɔmˈbrufka] is a village in the administrative district of Gmina Różan, within Maków County, Masovian Voivodeship, in east-central Poland.
