= Biernaty =

Biernaty refers to the following places in Poland:

- Biernaty, Masovian Voivodeship
- Biernaty, Warmian-Masurian Voivodeship
