= Konarzewo-Bolesty =

- Village
- Location within Poland
- Coordinates: 52°51′54″N 20°52′00″E
- Country: Poland
- Voivodeship: Masovian
- County: Maków
- Gmina: Karniewo
- Population: 16

Konarzewo-Bolesty [kɔnaˈʐɛvɔ bɔˈlɛstɨ] is a village in the administrative district of Gmina Karniewo, within Maków County, Masovian Voivodeship, in east-central Poland.

According to the 2021 census, Konarzewo-Bolesty had a population of 21 residents, and later 16 in 2023. Between 1975 and 1998, the village was part of the Ciechanów Voivodeship.

The closest major airport to Konarzewo-Bolesty is Warsaw Chopin Airport (WAW), located approximately 78 kilometers away.
