= Dzbądz =

- Village
- Location within Poland
- Coordinates: 52°51′N 21°26′E
- Country: Poland
- Voivodeship: Masovian
- County: Maków
- Gmina: Różan

Dzbądz [d͡zbɔnt͡s] is a village in the administrative district of Gmina Różan, within Maków County, Masovian Voivodeship, in east-central Poland.
