= Olki =

- Village
- Location within Poland
- Coordinates: 53°2′N 21°16′E
- Country: Poland
- Voivodeship: Masovian
- County: Maków
- Gmina: Sypniewo

Olki [ˈɔlki] is a village in the administrative district of Gmina Sypniewo, within Maków County, Masovian Voivodeship, in east-central Poland.
