= Baraniec, Maków County =

Baraniec
- Village
- Location within Poland
- Coordinates: 52°46′53″N 20°59′27″E
- Country: Poland
- Voivodeship: Masovian
- County: Maków
- Gmina: Karniewo

Baraniec [baˈraɲɛt͡s] is a village in the administrative district of Gmina Karniewo, within Maków County, Masovian Voivodeship, in east-central Poland.
