= Chrzanowo-Bronisze =

- Village
- Location within Poland
- Coordinates: 52°50′27″N 21°03′05″E
- Country: Poland
- Voivodeship: Masovian
- County: Maków
- Gmina: Karniewo

Chrzanowo-Bronisze [xʂaˈnɔvɔ brɔˈniʂɛ] is a village in the administrative district of Gmina Karniewo, within Maków County, Masovian Voivodeship, in east-central Poland.
