= Szlasy-Złotki =

- Village
- Location within Poland
- Coordinates: 52°49′54″N 21°02′26″E
- Country: Poland
- Voivodeship: Masovian
- County: Maków
- Gmina: Karniewo

Szlasy-Złotki [ˈʂlasɨ ˈzwɔtki] is a village in the administrative district of Gmina Karniewo, within Maków County, Masovian Voivodeship, in east-central Poland.
