= Nowy Podoś =

Village in Gmina Płoniawy-Bramura, Poland

- Village
- Location within Poland
- Coordinates: 52°59′17″N 21°05′58″E
- Country: Poland
- Voivodeship: Masovian
- County: Maków
- Gmina: Płoniawy-Bramura

Nowy Podoś [ˈnɔvɨ ˈpɔdɔɕ] is a village in the administrative district of Gmina Płoniawy-Bramura, within Maków County, Masovian Voivodeship, in east-central Poland.
