= Łaś =

- Village
- Location within Poland
- Coordinates: 52°51′N 21°18′E
- Country: Poland
- Voivodeship: Masovian
- County: Maków
- Gmina: Rzewnie
- Population: 236

Łaś [waɕ] is a village in the administrative district of Gmina Rzewnie, within Maków County, Masovian Voivodeship, in east-central Poland.
