= Krasnosielc Leśny =

- Village
- Location within Poland
- Coordinates: 53°0′16″N 21°9′14″E
- Country: Poland
- Voivodeship: Masovian
- County: Maków
- Gmina: Krasnosielc

Krasnosielc Leśny [krasˈnɔɕɛlt͡s ˈlɛɕnɨ] is a village in the administrative district of Gmina Krasnosielc, within Maków County, Masovian Voivodeship, in east-central Poland.
