= Dylewo, Maków County =

Dylewo
- Village
- Location within Poland
- Coordinates: 52°59′19″N 21°19′19″E
- Country: Poland
- Voivodeship: Masovian
- County: Maków
- Gmina: Sypniewo

Dylewo [dɨˈlɛvɔ] is a village in the administrative district of Gmina Sypniewo, within Maków County, Masovian Voivodeship, in east-central Poland.
