= Byszewo-Wygoda =

Polish village

- Village
- Location within Poland
- Coordinates: 52°49′9″N 20°56′6″E
- Country: Poland
- Voivodeship: Masovian
- County: Maków
- Gmina: Karniewo

Byszewo-Wygoda [bɨˈʂɛvɔ vɨˈɡɔda] is a village in the administrative district of Gmina Karniewo, within Maków County, Masovian Voivodeship, in east-central Poland.
