= Łazy, Maków County =

Łazy
- Village
- Location within Poland
- Coordinates: 53°2′N 21°7′E
- Country: Poland
- Voivodeship: Masovian
- County: Maków
- Gmina: Krasnosielc

Łazy [ˈwazɨ] is a village in the administrative district of Gmina Krasnosielc, within Maków County, Masovian Voivodeship, in east-central Poland.
