= Załęże-Eliasze =

- Village
- Location within Poland
- Coordinates: 52°56′33″N 21°20′4″E
- Country: Poland
- Voivodeship: Masovian
- County: Maków
- Gmina: Różan

Załęże-Eliasze [zaˈwɛ̃ʐɛ ɛˈljaʂɛ] is a village in the administrative district of Gmina Różan, within Maków County, Masovian Voivodeship, in east-central Poland.

== History ==
From 1975 to 1998, the village was administratively part of the Ostrołęka Voivodeship.
