= Budzyno-Walędzięta =

- Village
- Location within Poland
- Coordinates: 52°53′44″N 21°5′23″E
- Country: Poland
- Voivodeship: Masovian
- County: Maków
- Gmina: Czerwonka
- Population: 240

Budzyno-Walędzięta [buˈd͡zɨnɔ valɛnˈd͡ʑɛnta] is a village in the administrative district of Gmina Czerwonka, within Maków County, Masovian Voivodeship, in east-central Poland.
