= Chrzanowo, Gmina Rzewnie =

Chrzanowo
- Village
- Location within Poland
- Coordinates: 52°51′03″N 21°19′19″E
- Country: Poland
- Voivodeship: Masovian
- County: Maków
- Gmina: Rzewnie

Chrzanowo [xʂaˈnɔvɔ] is a village in the administrative district of Gmina Rzewnie, within Maków County, Masovian Voivodeship, in east-central Poland.
