= Tłucznice =

- Village
- Location within Poland
- Coordinates: 52°50′N 20°56′E
- Country: Poland
- Voivodeship: Masovian
- County: Maków
- Gmina: Karniewo

Tłucznice [twut͡ʂˈnit͡sɛ] is a village in the administrative district of Gmina Karniewo, within Maków County, Masovian Voivodeship, in east-central Poland.
