= Przytuły, Masovian Voivodeship =

Przytuły
- Village
- Location within Poland
- Coordinates: 53°3′41″N 21°9′58″E
- Country: Poland
- Voivodeship: Masovian
- County: Maków
- Gmina: Krasnosielc

Przytuły [pʂɨˈtuwɨ] is a village in the administrative district of Gmina Krasnosielc, within Maków County, Masovian Voivodeship, in east-central Poland.
