= Nowe Gąsewo =

- Village
- Location within Poland
- Coordinates: 52°59′00″N 21°13′22″E
- Country: Poland
- Voivodeship: Masovian
- County: Maków
- Gmina: Sypniewo

Nowe Gąsewo [ˈnɔvɛ ɡɔ̃ˈsɛvɔ] is a village in the administrative district of Gmina Sypniewo, within Maków County, Masovian Voivodeship, in east-central Poland.
