= Papierny Borek =

- Village
- Location within Poland
- Coordinates: 53°6′N 21°11′E
- Country: Poland
- Voivodeship: Masovian
- County: Maków
- Gmina: Krasnosielc

Papierny Borek [paˈpjɛrnɨ ˈbɔrɛk] is a village in the administrative district of Gmina Krasnosielc, within Maków County, Masovian Voivodeship, in east-central Poland.
