= Zalesie, Gmina Karniewo =

Zalesie
- Village
- Location within Poland
- Coordinates: 52°50′50″N 20°56′50″E
- Country: Poland
- Voivodeship: Masovian
- County: Maków
- Gmina: Karniewo

Zalesie [zaˈlɛɕɛ] is a village in the administrative district of Gmina Karniewo, within Maków County, Masovian Voivodeship, in east-central Poland.
