= Boruty, Gmina Sypniewo =

Boruty
- Village
- Location within Poland
- Coordinates: 53°1′40″N 21°15′23″E
- Country: Poland
- Voivodeship: Masovian
- County: Maków
- Gmina: Sypniewo

Boruty [bɔˈrutɨ] is a village in the administrative district of Gmina Sypniewo, in Maków County, Masovian Voivodeship, in east-central Poland.
