= Gmina Krasnosielc =

Gmina Krasnosielc Krasnosielc Commune
- Gmina
- Coat of arms

- Location within Poland
- Coordinates (Krasnosielc): 53°1′N 21°10′E
- Country: Poland
- Voivodeship: Masovian
- County: Maków
- Seat: Krasnosielc

Area
  - Total: 166.96 km^{2} (64.46 sq mi)

Population (2011)
  - Total: 6,652
  - Density: 39.84/km^{2} (103.2/sq mi)

Gmina Krasnosielc is a rural gmina (administrative district) in Maków County, Masovian Voivodeship, in east-central Poland. Its seat is the village of Krasnosielc, which lies approximately 18 kilometres (11 mi) north of Maków Mazowiecki and 90 km (56 mi) north of Warsaw.

The gmina covers an area of 166.96 square kilometres (64.5 sq mi), and as of 2006 its total population is 6,544 (6,652 in 2011).

== Villages ==
Gmina Krasnosielc contains the villages and settlements of Amelin, Bagienice Szlacheckie, Bagienice-Folwark, Biernaty, Budy Prywatne, Chłopia Łąka, Drążdżewo, Drążdżewo Małe, Drążdżewo-Kujawy, Elżbiecin, Grabowo, Grądy, Karolewo, Krasnosielc, Krasnosielc Leśny, Łazy, Niesułowo-Pach, Niesułowo-Wieś, Nowy Krasnosielc, Nowy Sielc, Papierny Borek, Perzanki-Borek, Pienice, Przytuły, Raki, Ruzieck, Sulicha, Wola Włościańska, Wola-Józefowo, Wólka Drążdżewska, Wólka Rakowska, Wymysły and Zwierzyniec.

== Neighbouring gminas ==
Gmina Krasnosielc is bordered by the gminas of Baranowo, Jednorożec, Olszewo-Borki, Płoniawy-Bramura and Sypniewo.
