= Gmina Sypniewo =

Gmina Sypniewo Sypniewo Commune
- Gmina
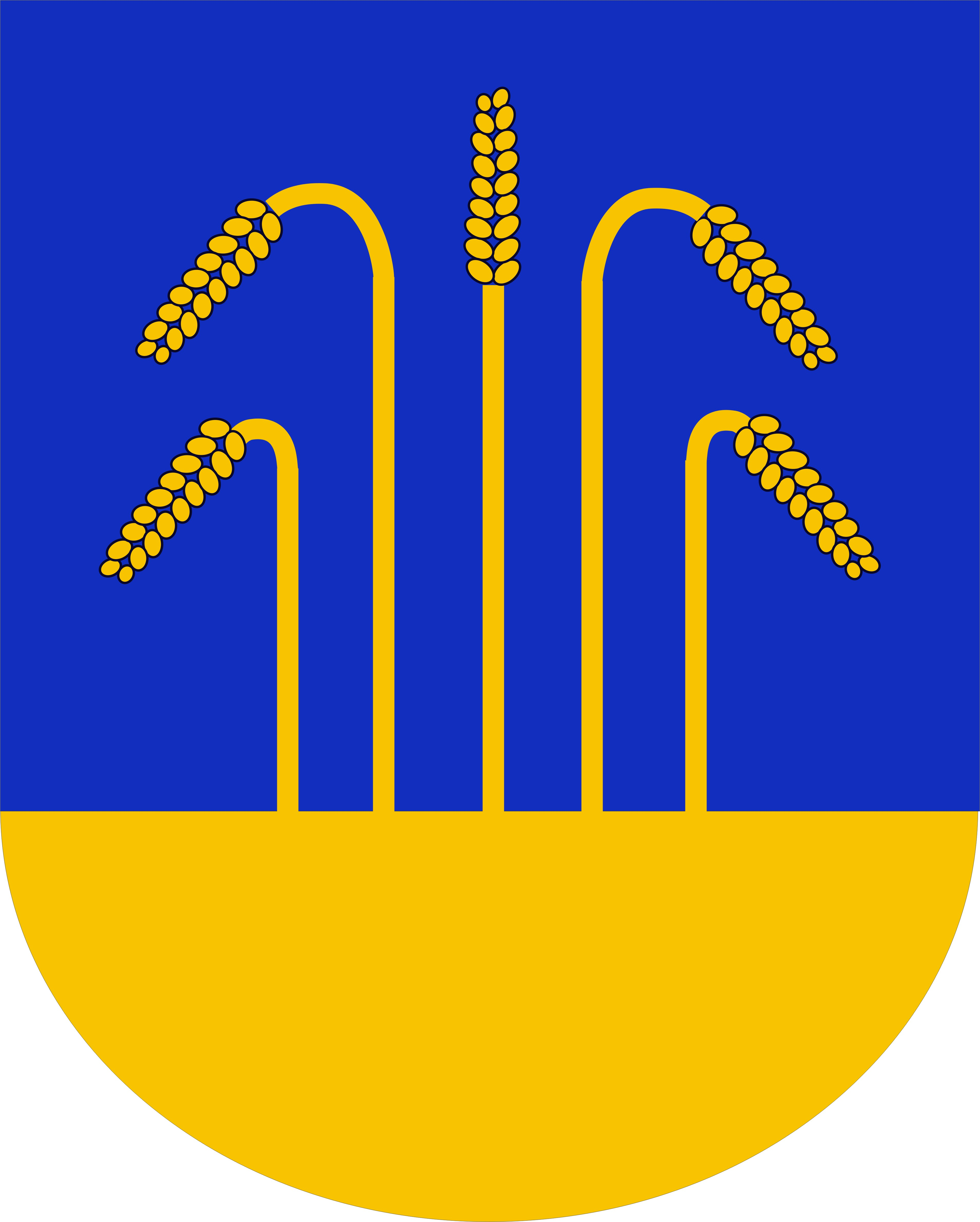
- Coat of arms

- Location within Poland
- Coordinates (Sypniewo): 53°1′N 21°19′E
- Country: Poland
- Voivodeship: Masovian
- County: Maków
- Seat: Sypniewo

Area
  - Total: 128.58 km^{2} (49.65 sq mi)

Population (2011)
  - Total: 3,479
  - Density: 27.06/km^{2} (70.08/sq mi)
- Website: www.sypniewo.pl

Gmina Sypniewo is a rural gmina (administrative district) in Maków County, Masovian Voivodeship, in east-central Poland. Its seat is the village of Sypniewo, which lies approximately 21 kilometres (13 mi) north-east of Maków Mazowiecki and 89 km (55 mi) north-east of Warsaw.

The gmina covers an area of 128.58 square kilometres (49.6 sq mi), and as of 2006 its total population is 3,528 (3,479 in 2011).

== Villages ==
Gmina Sypniewo contains the villages and settlements of Batogowo, Biedrzyce-Koziegłowy, Biedrzyce-Stara Wieś, Boruty, Chełchy, Chojnowo, Dylewo, Gąsewo Poduchowne, Glącka, Glinki-Rafały, Jarzyły, Majki-Tykiewki, Mamino, Nowe Gąsewo, Nowy Szczeglin, Olki, Poświętne, Rawy, Rzechówek, Rzechowo Wielkie, Rzechowo-Gać, Sławkowo, Stare Glinki, Strzemieczne-Sędki, Sypniewo, Szczeglin Poduchowny, Zalesie, Zamość and Ziemaki.

== Neighbouring gminas ==
Gmina Sypniewo is bordered by the gminas of Czerwonka, Krasnosielc, Młynarze, Olszewo-Borki and Płoniawy-Bramura.
