= Gmina Różan =

Gmina Różan Różan Commune
- Gmina
- Coat of arms
- Interactive map of Gmina Różan
- Coordinates (Różan): 52°52′58″N 21°23′8″E
- Country: Poland
- Voivodeship: Masovian
- County: Maków
- Seat: Różan

Area
  - Total: 84.1 km^{2} (32.5 sq mi)

Population (2011)
  - Total: 4,510
  - Density: 53.6/km^{2} (139/sq mi)
  - Urban: 2,753
  - Rural: 1,757
- Website: http://www.rozan.eur.pl/

Gmina Różan is an urban-rural gmina (administrative district) in Maków County, Masovian Voivodeship, in east-central Poland. Its seat is the town of Różan, which lies approximately 20 kilometres (12 mi) east of Maków Mazowiecki and 79 km (49 mi) north of Warsaw.

The gmina covers an area of 84.1 square kilometres (32.5 sq mi), and as of 2006 its total population is 4,423 (out of which the population of Różan amounts to 2,661, and the population of the rural part of the gmina is 1,762).

== Villages ==
Apart from the town of Różan, Gmina Różan contains the villages and settlements of Chełsty, Chrzczonki, Dąbrówka, Dyszobaba, Dzbądz, Kaszewiec, Miłony, Mroczki-Rębiszewo, Podborze, Prycanowo, Szygi, Załęże Wielkie, Załęże-Eliasze, Załęże-Gartki, Załęże-Sędzięta, Załuzie and Zawady-Ponikiew.

== Neighbouring gminas ==
Gmina Różan is bordered by the gminas of Czerwonka, Goworowo, Młynarze and Rzewnie.
