= Chodkowo-Biernaty =

- Village
- Location within Poland
- Coordinates: 53°02′34″N 21°01′47″E
- Country: Poland
- Voivodeship: Masovian
- County: Maków
- Gmina: Płoniawy-Bramura

Chodkowo-Biernaty [xɔtˈkɔvɔ bjɛrˈnatɨ] is a village in the administrative district of Gmina Płoniawy-Bramura, within Maków County, Masovian Voivodeship, in east-central Poland. It has a very small population (about 40–50 people based on recent estimates), which reflects its rural character and small size.
