= Biernaty, Masovian Voivodeship =

Biernaty
- Village
- Location within Poland
- Coordinates: 53°3′N 21°13′E
- Country: Poland
- Voivodeship: Masovian
- County: Maków
- Gmina: Krasnosielc

Biernaty [bjɛrˈnatɨ] is a village in the administrative district of Gmina Krasnosielc, within Maków County, Masovian Voivodeship, in east-central Poland.
