= Radom Confederation =

18th century pro-Russian confederation of Polish nobles

Radom Confederation (Polish: Konfederacja radomska, Lithuanian: Radomo konfederacija) was a konfederacja of nobility (szlachta) in the Polish–Lithuanian Commonwealth formed in Radom on 23 June 1767 to prevent reforms and defend the Golden Liberties. It was formed by Russian envoy to Poland Nicholas Repnin and backed by the Russian Imperial Army as a response of Catholic nobility to the earlier Protestant confederations of Slutzk and Toruń, approximately 74,000 nobles declared their support for Radom Confederation.

The marshal of the confederation was Karol Stanisław "Panie Kochanku" Radziwiłł, another leader was the primate of Poland, Gabriel Podoski, but in fact the real leader was Russian ambassador Nicholas Repnin, who was also responsible for forming the Protestant and Orthodox confederations. On his insistence the Confederates had to make peace with Polish king, pro-Russian Stanisław August Poniatowski, and send an envoy to the Russian tsarina, Catherine the Great, asking her to protect the freedoms of the Rzeczpospolita (Commonwealth). He stirred the internal unrest in Poland in order to increase Russian control over Poland. After the 1767 Repnin Sejm, where Repnin de facto dictated the legislation (Cardinal Laws) the Polish parliament (Sejm), Russian control over Poland became much stronger.

== See also ==
- Category:Radom confederates
