= Gościejewo, Masovian Voivodeship =

Gościejewo
- Village
- Location within Poland
- Coordinates: 52°47′N 21°3′E
- Country: Poland
- Voivodeship: Masovian
- County: Maków
- Gmina: Karniewo

Gościejewo (Polish pronunciation: [ɡɔɕt͡ɕɛˈjɛvɔ]) is a village in the administrative district of Gmina Karniewo, within Maków County, Masovian Voivodeship, in east-central Poland.
