= Sypniewo, Masovian Voivodeship =

Sypniewo
- Village
- Location within Poland
- Coordinates: 53°1′N 21°19′E
- Country: Poland
- Voivodeship: Masovian
- County: Maków
- Gmina: Sypniewo
- Population: 480

Sypniewo [sɨpˈɲɛvɔ] is a village in Maków County, Masovian Voivodeship, in east-central Poland. It is the seat of the gmina (administrative district) called Gmina Sypniewo.
