= Krasiniec =

- Village
- Location within Poland
- Coordinates: 52°56′N 20°59′E
- Country: Poland
- Voivodeship: Masovian
- County: Maków
- Gmina: Płoniawy-Bramura
- Founded: 1860s
- Founded by: Ludwik Józef Krasiński
- Time zone: UTC+1 (CET)
  - Summer (DST): UTC+2 (CEST)
- Vehicle registration: WMA

Krasiniec [kraˈɕiɲɛt͡s] is a village in the administrative district of Gmina Płoniawy-Bramura, within Maków County, Masovian Voivodeship, in east-central Poland. It is situated on the Węgierka River, a tributary of the Orzyc River.

== History ==
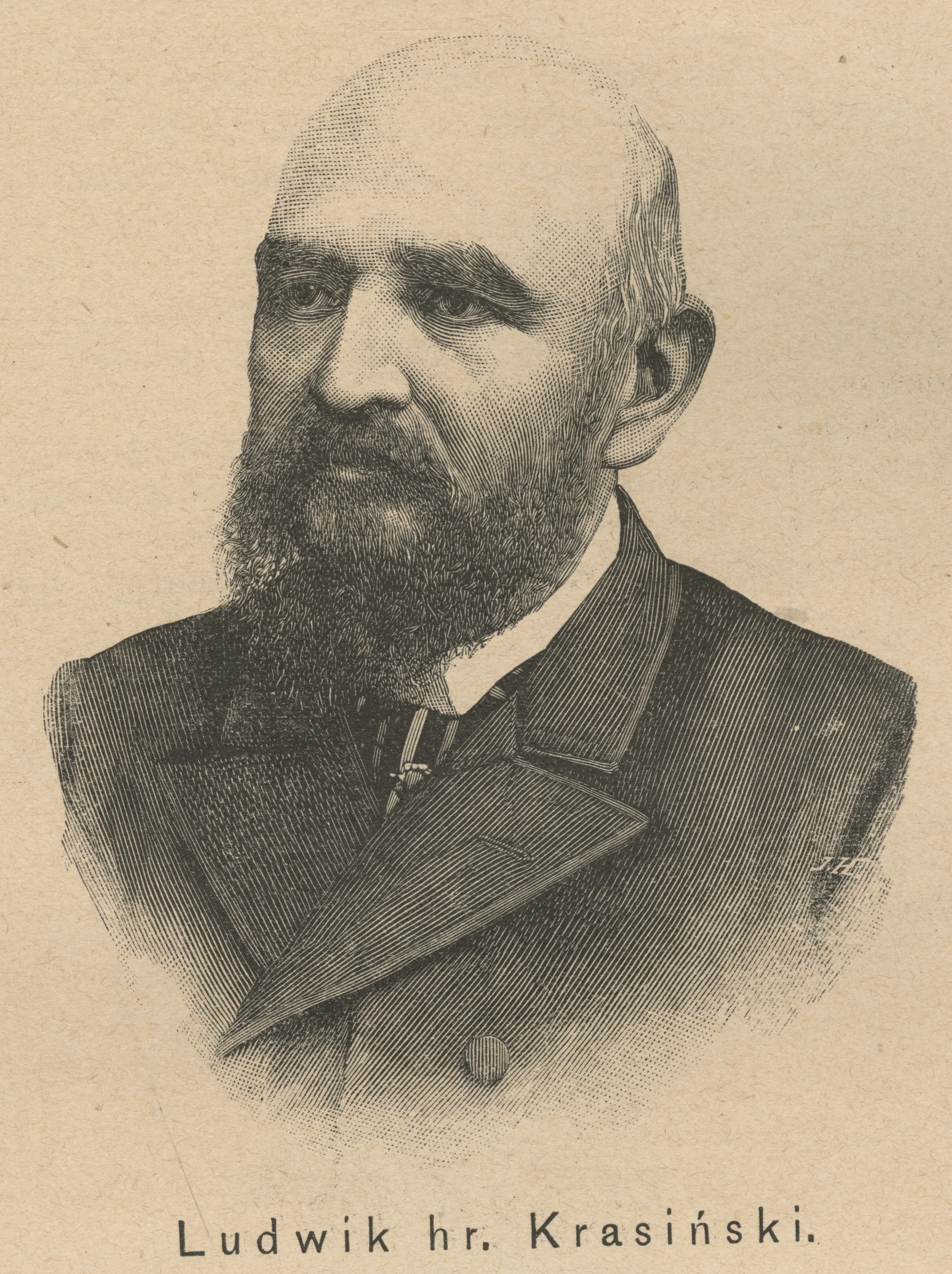
Ludwik Józef Krasiński, founder of Krasiniec

In the 1860s, the Krasiniec sugar factory was founded by Count Ludwik Józef Krasiński, one of the wealthiest Poles of the 19th-century, next to which a settlement of the same name soon developed. During World War I, the sugar factory was plundered by the Russians.

According to the 1921 Polish census, the village had a population of 364, 72.3% Polish, 27.5% Kalmyk, and 0.3% Lithuanian. It was the sole Kalmyk community of interwar Poland, with the only other Kalmyk person living in the nearby town of Przasnysz.
