= Karniewo, Maków County =

Karniewo
- Village
- Location within Poland
- Coordinates: 52°50′N 20°59′E
- Country: Poland
- Voivodeship: Masovian
- County: Maków
- Gmina: Karniewo
- Postal code: 06-425
- Area code: (+48) 29
- Vehicle registration: WMA

Karniewo [karˈɲɛvɔ] is a village in Maków County, Masovian Voivodeship, in east-central Poland. It is the seat of the gmina (administrative district) called Gmina Karniewo.
