= Węgrzynowo, Maków County =

Węgrzynowo
- Village
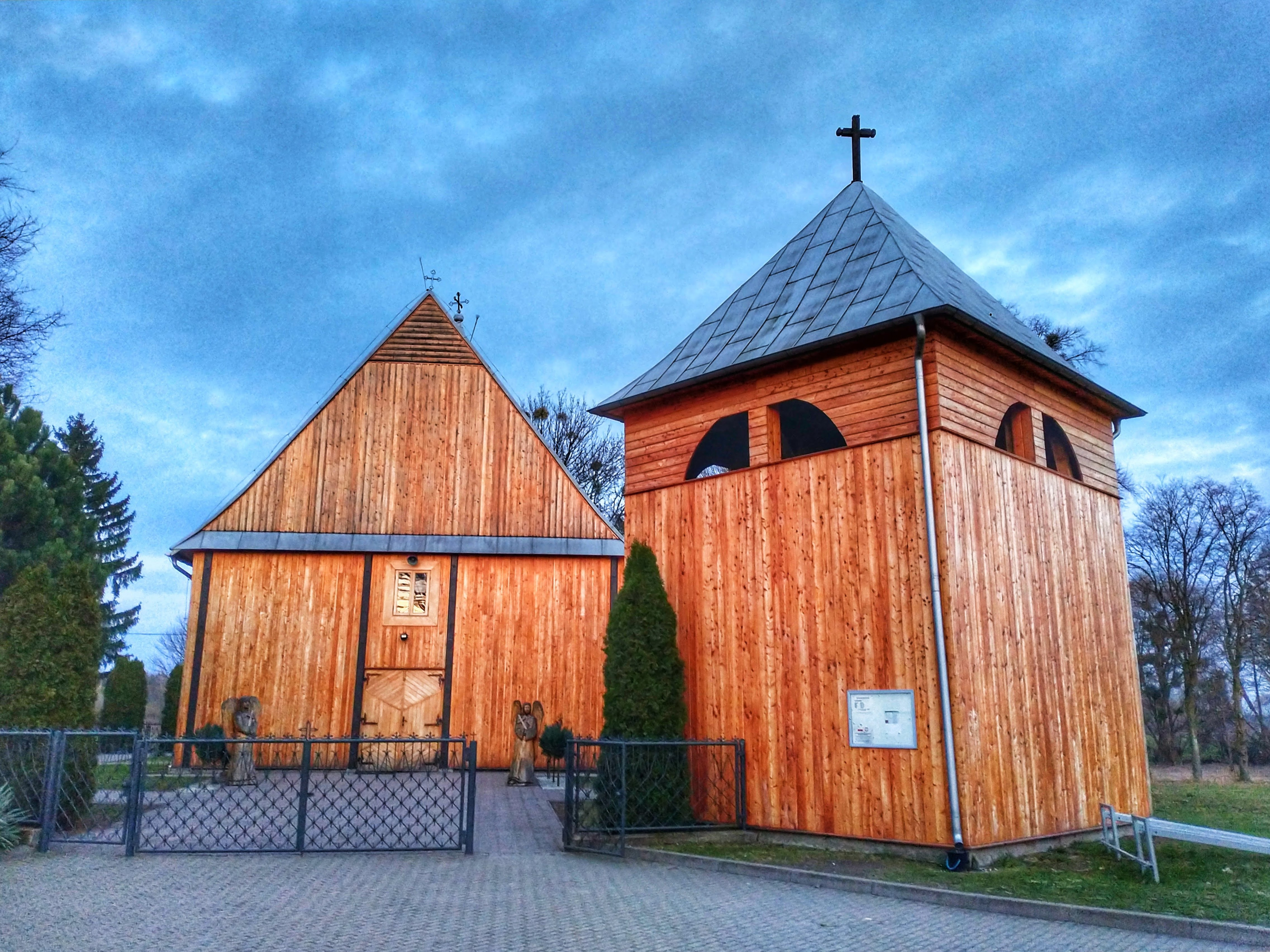
- Holy Spirit church in Węgrzynowo

- Location within Poland
- Coordinates: 52°56′N 21°1′E
- Country: Poland
- Voivodeship: Masovian
- County: Maków
- Gmina: Płoniawy-Bramura

Population
  - Total: 680
- Time zone: UTC+1 (CET)
  - Summer (DST): UTC+2 (CEST)
- Postal code: 06-211
- Vehicle registration: WMA

Węgrzynowo [vɛŋɡʐɨˈnɔvɔ] is a village in the administrative district of Gmina Płoniawy-Bramura, within Maków County, Masovian Voivodeship, in north-central Poland.

== History ==
During the German occupation in World War II, the occupiers operated a forced labour camp for Poles and Jews in the village from 1941 to 1943.
