= Gmina Rzewnie =

Gmina Rzewnie Rzewnie Commune
- Gmina
- Location within Poland
- Coordinates (Rzewnie): 52°50′N 21°21′E
- Country: Poland
- Voivodeship: Masovian
- County: Maków
- Seat: Rzewnie

Area
  - Total: 111.72 km^{2} (43.14 sq mi)

Population (2011)
  - Total: 2,718
  - Density: 24.33/km^{2} (63.01/sq mi)

Gmina Rzewnie is a rural gmina (administrative district) in Maków County, Masovian Voivodeship, in east-central Poland. Its seat is the village of Rzewnie, which lies approximately 18 kilometres (11 mi) east of Maków Mazowiecki and 73 km (45 mi) north of Warsaw.

The gmina covers an area of 111.72 square kilometres (43.1 sq mi), and as of 2006 its total population is 2,699 (2,718 in 2011).

== Villages ==
Gmina Rzewnie contains the villages and settlements of Bindużka, Boruty, Brzóze Duże, Brzóze Małe, Chrzanowo, Chrzczony, Dąbrówka, Drozdowo, Grudunki, Łachy Włościańskie, Łaś, Łasiewity, Małki, Mroczki-Kawki, Napiórki Butne, Napiórki Ciężkie, Nowe Drozdowo, Nowe Łachy, Nowy Sielc, Orłowo, Pruszki, Rzewnie, Słojki and Stary Sielc.

== Neighbouring gminas ==
Gmina Rzewnie is bordered by the gminas of Czerwonka, Długosiodło, Goworowo, Obryte, Różan, Rząśnik and Szelków.
