= Gmina Karniewo =

Gmina Karniewo Karniewo Commune
- Gmina
- Location within Poland
- Coordinates (Karniewo): 52°50′N 20°59′E
- Country: Poland
- Voivodeship: Masovian
- County: Maków
- Seat: Karniewo

Area
  - Total: 129.38 km^{2} (49.95 sq mi)

Population (2011)
  - Total: 5,400
  - Density: 42/km^{2} (110/sq mi)
- Website: www.karniewo.eur.pl

Gmina Karniewo is a rural gmina (administrative district) in Maków County, Masovian Voivodeship, in east-central Poland. Its seat is the village of Karniewo, which lies approximately 8 kilometres (5 mi) south-west of Maków Mazowiecki and 67 km (41 mi) north of Warsaw.

The gmina covers an area of 129.38 square kilometres (50.0 sq mi), and as of 2006 its total population is 5,448 (5,400 in 2011).

== Villages ==
Gmina Karniewo contains the villages and settlements of Baraniec, Byszewo, Byszewo-Wygoda, Chełchy Dzierskie, Chełchy Iłowe, Chełchy Kmiece, Chełchy-Chabdzyno, Chełchy-Jakusy, Chełchy-Klimki, Chrzanowo-Bronisze, Czarnostów, Czarnostów-Polesie, Gościejewo, Karniewo, Konarzewo-Bolesty, Krzemień, Leśniewo, Łukowo, Malechy, Milewo-Malonki, Milewo-Wypychy, Obiecanowo, Ośnica, Rafały, Romanowo, Rutki, Słoniawy, Szlasy-Złotki, Szwelice, Tłucznice, Wólka Łukowska, Wronowo, Żabin Karniewski, Żabin Łukowski, Zakrzewo, Zalesie, Zaręby and Zelki Dąbrowe.

== Neighbouring gminas ==
Gmina Karniewo is bordered by the town of Maków Mazowiecki and by the gminas of Czerwonka, Gołymin-Ośrodek, Gzy, Krasne, Płoniawy-Bramura, Pułtusk and Szelków.
