= Gmina Płoniawy-Bramura =

Gmina Płoniawy-Bramura Płoniawy-Bramura Commune
- Gmina
- Coat of arms

- Location within Poland
- Coordinates (Płoniawy-Bramura): 52°58′38″N 21°4′18″E
- Country: Poland
- Voivodeship: Masovian
- County: Maków
- Seat: Płoniawy-Bramura

Area
  - Total: 134.96 km^{2} (52.11 sq mi)

Population (2011)
  - Total: 5,755
  - Density: 42.64/km^{2} (110.4/sq mi)
- Website: www.ploniawy-bramura.pl

Gmina Płoniawy-Bramura is a rural gmina (administrative district) in Maków County, Masovian Voivodeship, in east-central Poland. Its seat is the village of Płoniawy-Bramura, which lies approximately 12 kilometres (7 mi) north of Maków Mazowiecki and 83 km (52 mi) north of Warsaw.

The gmina covers an area of 134.96 square kilometres (52.1 sq mi), and as of 2006 its total population is 5,864 (5,755 in 2011).

== Villages ==
Gmina Płoniawy-Bramura contains the villages and settlements of Bobino Wielkie, Bobino-Grzybki, Bogdalec, Chodkowo Wielkie, Chodkowo-Biernaty, Chodkowo-Kuchny, Chodkowo-Załogi, Choszczewka, Dłutkowo, Gołoniwy, Jaciążek, Kalinowiec, Kobylin, Kobylinek, Krasiniec, Krzyżewo Borowe, Krzyżewo Nadrzeczne, Łęgi, Młodzianowo, Nowa Zblicha, Nowe Płoniawy, Nowy Podoś, Obłudzin, Płoniawy-Bramura, Płoniawy-Kolonia, Popielarka, Prace, Retka, Rogowo, Stara Zblicha, Stare Zacisze, Stary Podoś, Suche, Szczuki, Szlasy Bure, Szlasy-Łozino, Węgrzynówek, Węgrzynowo, Zawady Dworskie and Zawady-Huta.

== Neighbouring gminas ==
Gmina Płoniawy-Bramura is bordered by the gminas of Czerwonka, Jednorożec, Karniewo, Krasne, Krasnosielc, Przasnysz and Sypniewo.
