= Czerwonka, Maków County =

Czerwonka
- Village
- Location within Poland
- Coordinates: 52°53′50″N 21°12′56″E
- Country: Poland
- Voivodeship: Masovian
- County: Maków
- Gmina: Czerwonka
- Population: 150

Czerwonka [t͡ʂɛrˈvɔnka] is a village in Maków County, Masovian Voivodeship, in east-central Poland. It is the seat of the gmina (administrative district) called Gmina Czerwonka.
