= Wronowo, Masovian Voivodeship =

Wronowo
- Village
- Location within Poland
- Coordinates: 52°51′03″N 20°55′44″E
- Country: Poland
- Voivodeship: Masovian
- County: Maków
- Gmina: Karniewo

Wronowo [vrɔˈnɔvɔ] is a village in the administrative district of Gmina Karniewo, within Maków County, Masovian Voivodeship, in east-central Poland.
