= Rzewnie =

- Village
- Location within Poland
- Coordinates: 52°50′N 21°21′E
- Country: Poland
- Voivodeship: Masovian
- County: Maków
- Gmina: Rzewnie

Rzewnie [ˈʐɛvɲɛ] is a village in Maków County, Masovian Voivodeship, in east-central Poland. It is the seat of the gmina (administrative district) called Gmina Rzewnie.
