= Boruty, Gmina Rzewnie =

Boruty
- Village
- Location within Poland
- Coordinates: 52°49′55″N 21°21′40″E
- Country: Poland
- Voivodeship: Masovian
- County: Maków
- Gmina: Rzewnie

Boruty [bɔˈrutɨ] is a village in the administrative district of Gmina Rzewnie, within Maków County, Masovian Voivodeship, in east-central Poland.
