= Chodkowo Wielkie =

- Village
- Location within Poland
- Coordinates: 53°2′N 21°3′E
- Country: Poland
- Voivodeship: Masovian
- County: Maków
- Gmina: Płoniawy-Bramura
- Time zone: UTC+1 (CET)
  - Summer (DST): UTC+2 (CEST)
- Postal code: 06-210
- Vehicle registration: WMA

Chodkowo Wielkie [xɔtˈkɔvɔ ˈvjɛlkʲɛ] is a village in the administrative district of Gmina Płoniawy-Bramura, within Maków County, Masovian Voivodeship, in north-central Poland.

== History ==
During the German occupation in World War II, the occupiers operated a forced labour camp for Poles and Jews in the village from October 1940 to April 1941.

In 1975-1998 the village administratively belonged to the Ostrołęka Voivodeship.
