= Płoniawy-Bramura =

- Village
- Coat of arms

- Location within Poland
- Coordinates: 52°58′38″N 21°4′18″E
- Country: Poland
- Voivodeship: Masovian
- County: Maków
- Gmina: Płoniawy-Bramura

Płoniawy-Bramura [pwɔˈɲavɨ braˈmura] is a village in Maków County, Masovian Voivodeship, in east-central Poland. It is the seat of the gmina (administrative district) called Gmina Płoniawy-Bramura.
