= Gmina Czerwonka =

Gmina Czerwonka Czerwonka Commune
- Gmina
- Flag Coat of arms

- Location within Poland
- Coordinates (Czerwonka): 52°53′50″N 21°12′56″E
- Country: Poland
- Voivodeship: Masovian
- County: Maków
- Seat: Czerwonka

Area
  - Total: 110.59 km^{2} (42.70 sq mi)

Population (2011)
  - Total: 2,672
  - Density: 24.16/km^{2} (62.58/sq mi)
- Website: www.czerwonka.pl

Gmina Czerwonka is a rural gmina (administrative district) in Maków County, Masovian Voivodeship, in east-central Poland. Its seat is the village of Czerwonka, which lies approximately 9 kilometres (6 mi) north-east of Maków Mazowiecki and 77 km (48 mi) north of Warsaw.

The gmina covers an area of 110.59 square kilometres (42.7 sq mi), and as of 2006 its total population is 2,646 (2,672 in 2011).

== Villages ==
Gmina Czerwonka contains the villages and settlements of Adamowo, Budzyno-Bolki, Budzyno-Lipniki, Budzyno-Walędzięta, Cieciórki Szlacheckie, Cieciórki Włościańskie, Ciemniewo, Czerwonka, Dąbrówka, Guty Duże, Guty Małe, Jankowo, Janopole, Kałęczyn, Krzyżewo-Jurki, Krzyżewo-Marki, Lipniki, Mariampole, Perzanowo, Ponikiew Wielka, Sewerynowo, Soje, Tłuszcz and Ulaski.

== Neighbouring gminas ==
Gmina Czerwonka is bordered by the town of Maków Mazowiecki and by the gminas of Karniewo, Młynarze, Płoniawy-Bramura, Różan, Rzewnie, Sypniewo and Szelków.
