= Chodkowo-Załogi =

Village in Gmina Płoniawy-Bramura, Poland

- Village
- Location within Poland
- Coordinates: 53°01′32″N 21°02′08″E
- Country: Poland
- Voivodeship: Masovian
- County: Maków
- Gmina: Płoniawy-Bramura

Chodkowo-Załogi [xɔtˈkɔvɔ zaˈwɔɡi] is a village in the administrative district of Gmina Płoniawy-Bramura, within Maków County, Masovian Voivodeship, in east-central Poland.
