= Kazimierz Żorawski =

Polish mathematician (1866–1953)

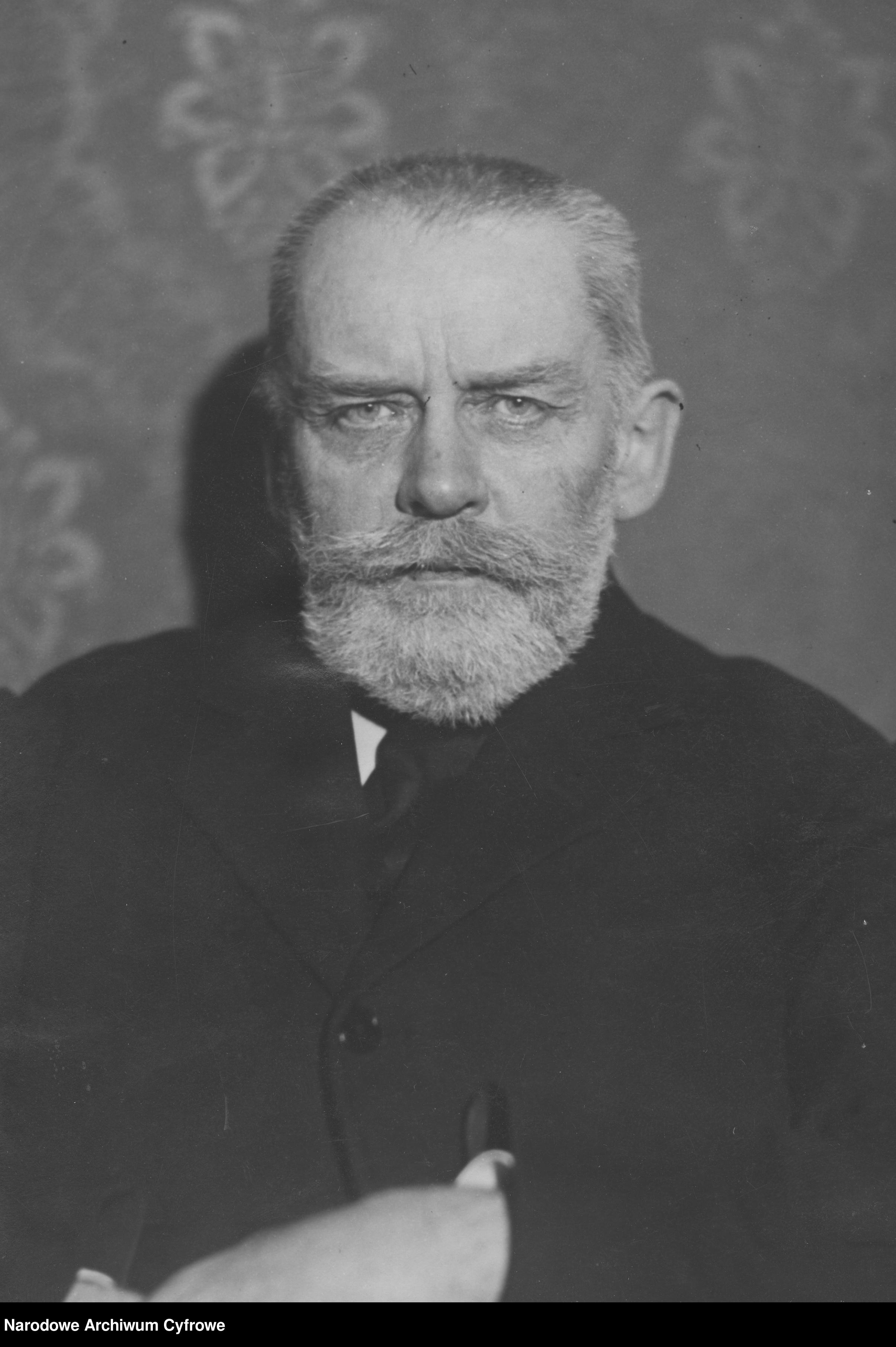
- Żorawski in 1928
- Born: 22 June 1866; Szczuki, Congress Poland
- Died: January 23, 1953 (aged 86); Warsaw, Polish People's Republic
- Education: University of Warsaw; Leipzig University
- Spouse: Leokadia Jewniewicz
- Scientific career
- Fields: Mathematics
- Workplaces: Jagiellonian University; Warsaw University of Technology; University of Warsaw
- Thesis: Über Biegungsinvarianten. Eine Anwendung der Lieschen Gruppentheorie (1891)
- Doctoral advisor: Sophus Lie
- Doctoral students: Franciszek Leja; Władysław Ślebodziński

Paulin Kazimierz Stefan Żorawski (Polish: [ʐɔˈrafski]; June 22, 1866 – January 23, 1953) was a Polish mathematician. Żorawski's main interests were invariants of differential forms, integral invariants of Lie groups, differential geometry and fluid mechanics. His work in these disciplines was to prove important in other fields of mathematics and science, such as differential equations, geometry and physics (especially astrophysics and cosmology).

== Biography ==
Kazimierz Żorawski was born in Szczuki near Ciechanów, in the Russian Empire, now in Poland, to Juliusz Bronisław Wiktor Żórawski and Kazimiera Żórawska. In 1884 he completed secondary school in Warsaw. From 1884 to 1888 he studied mathematics at the University of Warsaw. In 1889 he was selected to continue his mathematics studies on the strength of a paper on observations that he had made at the Warsaw Astronomical Observatory.

In the years that followed he studied the theory of conversion groups and analytical mechanics in Leipzig, and differential equations in Göttingen. In 1891 he was awarded a PhD (under M. Sophius Lie) in Leipzig for his thesis on the applications of group conversion theory to differential geometry. In 1892 he became a lecturer at the Polytechnic Higher School of Lwów where he taught mathematics and, in 1893, assumed the Chair of Mechanical Science.

In 1893, Żorawski received a doctorate in mathematics from Jagiellonian University in Kraków, and in 1895 he traveled to Berlin to study higher level geodesy. He later returned to Kraków where, he was named assistant professor and, in 1898, full professor of mathematics at Jagiellonian where he taught higher analysis, geometry (analytic, differential and projective), theory of algebraic curves and theory of singularities. In 1900 he was elected a member of the Academy of Learning (from 1919 Polish Academy of Learning) in Kraków.

In 1905, Żorawski became a Dean of the Faculty of philosophy at the Jagiellonian University in Kraków, and in 1910, he became an associate member of the Czech Academy of Sciences in Prague. In 1911, he became a president of the Societies of the Scientific Committee. Two years later he took part in the Organizational Committee of Academy of Maining in Kraków. From 1917 to 1918, he was a rector and from 1918 to 1919 vice-rector of the Jagiellonian University.

In 1919, Żorawski settled in Warsaw where he became a full professor in mathematics at the Warsaw University of Technology, while at the same time teaching courses on the application of geometric analysis at the University of Warsaw. That same year he became a member of the Polish Mathematical Society.

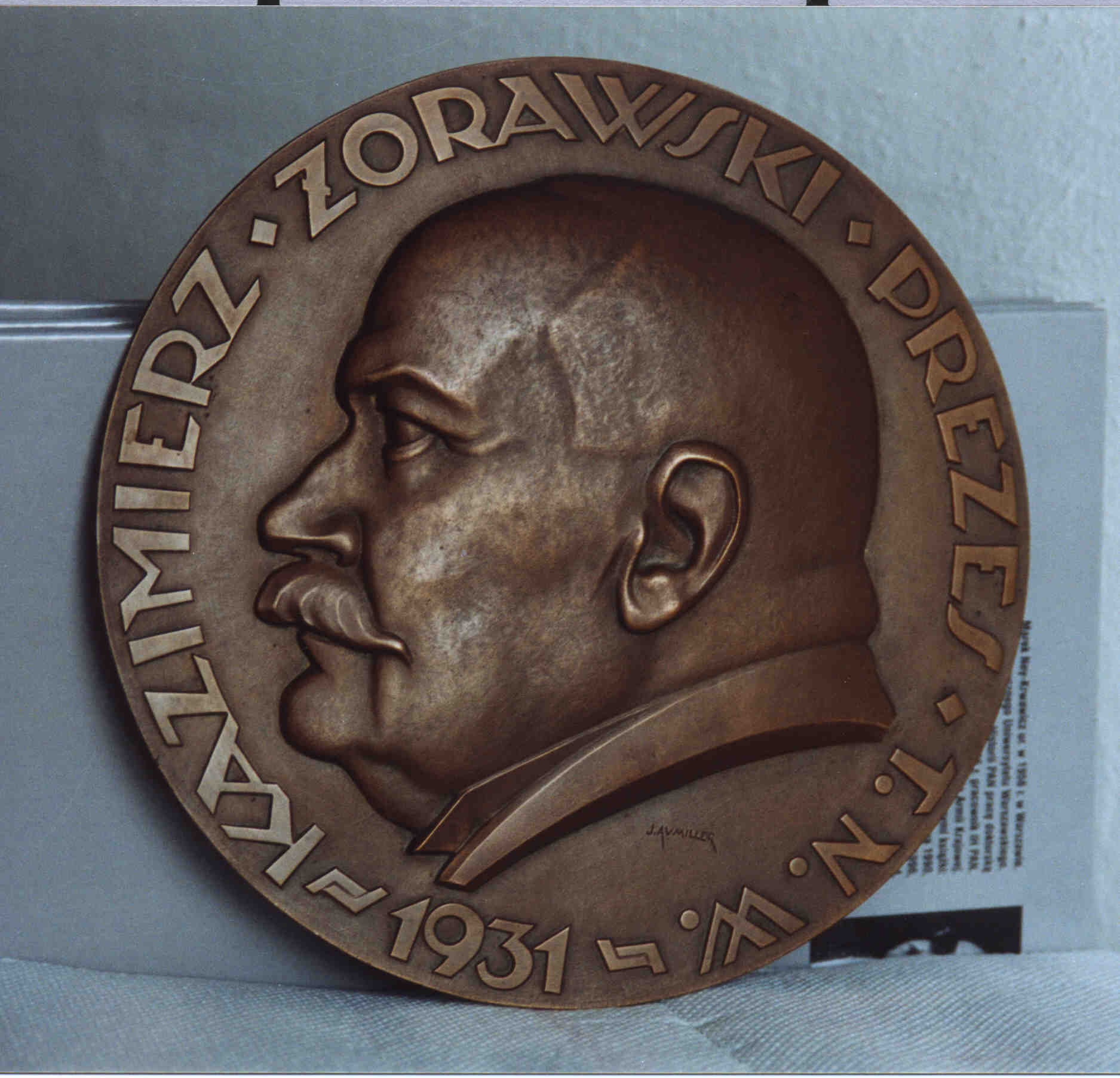
Commemorative Żorawski Medal, 1931

In 1920, Żorawski was elected to the Warsaw Society of Science and Letters, and from 1926 to 1931, served as its president. To honor his services, the Society struck a commemorative medal (see picture) in 1931. At the same time, he became an active member of the Warsaw Technical Academy of Science, and in 1926, a full professor of mathematics at the University of Warsaw. He was a Polish delegate for the International Committee on Intellectual Cooperation which was formally established in January 1922 (Marie Curie was a prominent member of this organization).

Żorawski announced his retirement in 1935 after 46 years devoted to professorship. Upon his retirement, the University of Warsaw conferred upon him the title of Professor Emeritus in mathematics and natural science.

Both before World War II and during the Nazi occupation of Poland, Professor Żorawski worked on analytical geometry, primarily in the area of first- and second-degree plane figures and differential properties of real and complex plane figures. His work was three-quarters completed when the Warsaw Uprising occurred. Żorawski, like tens of thousands of Warsaw residents, was expelled from the capital and sent to Pruszków. His apartment, which contained all of his property, including many of his scientific papers, was destroyed by fire.

Upon his release from the camp of Pruszków along with a group of other scientists, Zorawski took refuge in Nieborów, staying at the home of the Radziwill family. After the Red Army occupied Poland, Żorawski returned to a destroyed Warsaw and lived for a time with his daughter Leokadia Paprocka. Shortly thereafter, the Ministry for Education gave him a small bedroom with a kitchen at the Students House at the Narutowicz Square in Warsaw, one of the few buildings not destroyed by the Germans during the war. There he rewrote the nearly two-thirds (2650 pages) of his work that had been destroyed during the Warsaw Uprising.

In 1952, Żorawski was named a full member of the Polish Academy of Sciences. He was also decorated with the Commander's Cross of the Order of Polonia Restituta and the Gold Cross of Merit.

Żorawski died in 1953.

After his death, the importance of his work to the development of Polish mathematics was recognized by many scientists. A telegram addressed to his family by Bronisław Knaster, Edward Marczewski, Hugo Steinhaus, and Władysław Ślebodziński expressed this recognition: "[W]e wish to express to the family of Professor Kazimierz Żorawski our deep compassion. He was the first of the scientists of his generation to bring the name of Poland to the forefront of world mathematics."

== Accomplishments ==
Kazimierz Żorawski dealt with a particularly difficult field of mathematics – continuous invariants of Lie groups, and the results of his work have been applied to other fields of mathematics and science, especially differential equations, geometry and physics.

The seventy scientific works of Professor Żorawski relate mainly to analytical geometry, differential geometry, Lie groups, differential equations, kinematics of continuous symmetry, and non-Euclidean complex geometry.

=== Kraków School of Mathematics ===
At the turn of the 20th century, groups of mathematicians worked in the Polish scientific centers of Lwów, Kraków and Warsaw and created the "mathematical Schools" of Warsaw, Lwów and Kraków. Kazimierz Żorawski, along with Stanisław Zaremba, (both faculty members of Jagiellonian University) was a cofounder of the Kraków School of Mathematics, to which professors Franciszek Leja, Władysław Ślebodziński and Tadeusz Ważewski also belonged. Thus, Jagiellonian became the center of traditional analysis of differential equations and analytical functions.

=== Polish Mathematical Society ===
On April 2, 1919, Żorawski chaired the inaugural meeting, in Kraków, of the Mathematical Society, which soon changed its name to the Polish Mathematical Society. Żorawski is considered one of the key founders of this Society.

=== Development of Polish mathematics ===
In 1958, Polish Mathematical Society member Władysław Ślebodziński recalled the importance of the role played by Stanisław Zaremba and Kazimierz Żorawski in the development of Polish mathematics:

... One can say that, thanks to these two scientists, Polish mathematics ceased being a mere consumer of foreign thinking and analysis. Both played pivotal roles in the development of this science. Under the political conditions of the time, Stanislaw Zaremba and Kazimierz Żorawski were, for fifteen years, the only representatives of cutting-edge Polish mathematics (...) judging these facts by contrasting them with the current state of affairs, shows their immense progress and accomplishments (...) in spite of the catastrophic effects on Polish mathematics caused by the Nazi occupation.

=== Lie groups ===
Żorawski was a student of eminent Norwegian professor Sophus Lie, the author of the theory of continuous groups (Lie groups). Żorawski developed several areas close to the theory of Lie groups and other theories which were based upon it—in particular the theories of differential equations and differential geometry, as well as topics from the theory of integral invariants (new at that time), and selected problems of kinematics.

While a professor in Leipzig, Lie wrote the following regarding Żorawski's work devoted to Lie groups:

Among the work done in Leipzig, let us remember in particular the superb work of Zorawski on the invariants of flexibility. With much ability, Żorawski worked to resolve difficult and complicated calculations which were necessary to solve the problems...

== Personal life ==
In 1863, Żorawski's mother, Kazimiera, took part in the January Uprising against the Russian Empire. This uprising started as a spontaneous protest by young Poles against conscription into the Russian Army and was soon joined by politicians and high ranking Polish officers from the tsarist army. While the uprising failed militarily, it succeeded in blunting the effect of the Tsar's abolition of serfdom in the Russian partition. Kazimiera was captured and imprisoned by the Russian authorities, and her father was imprisoned in the citadel at Warsaw, where he later died.

Żorawski had five siblings, one of whom, Stanislaw, became proprietor of the Obrebiec Estate, near Przasnysz. In 1940, his property was seized by the Nazis and Stanislaw was arrested and interned at the Mauthausen-Gusen concentration camp, where he died.

Żorawski fell in love with the family governess, Maria Skłodowska (later better known as Marie Curie), whose father was a relative of the Żorawskis. The two discussed marriage, but Żorawski's parents rejected Maria due to her family's poverty. Nevertheless, their hopes of marriage continued until 1891, when a dispirited Maria moved to Warsaw and then to Paris, where she eventually married Pierre Curie and earned two Nobel Prizes.

Żorawski married Leokadia Jewniewicz, a pianist. Her father, Hipolit, was a professor at the Institute of Technology in St. Petersburg, specializing in applied mathematics. One of his works, "The Theory of Elasticity", was published posthumously in Warsaw in 1910.

Żorawski and his wife had three children: Juliusz, Leokadia, and Maria. Juliusz became an architect, often compared with Le Corbusier; after World War II he was a professor of architecture at the Kraków Polytechnic.

== See also ==
- List of Poles
