= Krzyżewo, Podlaskie Voivodeship =

Krzyżewo
- Village
- Location within Poland
- Coordinates: 53°2′N 22°45′E
- Country: Poland
- Voivodeship: Podlaskie
- County: Wysokie Mazowieckie
- Gmina: Sokoły

Krzyżewo [kʂɨˈʐɛvɔ] is a village in the administrative district of Gmina Sokoły, within Wysokie Mazowieckie County, Podlaskie Voivodeship, in north-eastern Poland.

== See also ==
- Krzyżewski
