= Cardinal Laws =

Polish–Lithuanian Commonwealth quasi-constitution

The Cardinal Laws (Polish: Prawa kardynalne) were a quasi-constitution enacted in Warsaw, Polish–Lithuanian Commonwealth, by the Repnin Sejm of 1767–68. Enshrining most of the conservative laws responsible for the inefficient functioning of the Commonwealth, and passed under foreign duress, they have been seen rather negatively by historians.

== Origin ==
The Cardinal Laws were imposed on the Commonwealth by Russia's Empress Catherine the Great with Russian forces commanded by Prince Nicholas Repnin at the Repnin Sejm of 1767–68.

== Features and significance ==
Ostensibly the Cardinal Laws were intended to ensure the "Golden Liberty" of the Polish-Lithuanian nobility, as demanded by nobles united in the Radom Confederation. In fact, the Cardinal Laws made it certain that the political system of the Polish–Lithuanian Commonwealth would remain ineffectual and easily controllable by its neighbors.

The Cardinal Laws' key features included the liberum veto, the free election of Poland's king, Neminem captivabimus, and the right to form confederations and to raise rokoszes—all, privileges of the nobility that had made the Commonwealth's political system of "Golden Liberty" ungovernable. They also confirmed the lifelong term of the Commonwealth office holders, a similar confirmation of a lifelong possession of królewszczyzna (crown lands). The laws confirmed superior position of nobility over the peasantry, with the exception of the right of death penalty.

In a more positive view, the cardinal laws can be seen as a form of constitution (Bardach uses the term ustawa zasadnicza), attempting to organize elements of the law of Poland, and also attempting to guarantee the stability of Commonwealth borders.

== Aftermath ==
In 1768 Russia issued a "guarantee" to the Polish nobility, promising to defend the cardinal laws, and at the Partition Sejm of 1775 this guarantee was joined by the Kingdom of Prussia and the Austrian Empire.

Russian intervention was unsuccessfully challenged by the Bar Confederation, whose failure led to the First Partition of Poland (1772).

The Cardinal Laws were annulled by the Constitution of 3 May passed by the Great Sejm of 1788–92 but reinstituted by the Grodno Sejm following Poland's defeat in the 1792 War in Defense of the Constitution. In fact it was the abolition of many of the cardinal laws that was used by the Targowica Confederation magnates as a reason to ask the Russians to intervene.

The Cardinal Laws remained in effect for the last three years of the Commonwealth's existence, until the final, Third Partition of Poland.

== See also ==
- Constitution of 3 May 1791
