= Krzyżewo, Braniewo County =

Krzyżewo
- Village
- Location within Poland
- Coordinates: 54°18′34″N 19°38′58″E
- Country: Poland
- Voivodeship: Warmian-Masurian
- County: Braniewo
- Gmina: Frombork
- Population (approx.): 80

Krzyżewo (Polish pronunciation: [kʂɨˈʐɛvɔ]) is a village in the administrative district of Gmina Frombork, within Braniewo County, Warmian-Masurian Voivodeship, in northern Poland.

== See also ==
- Krzyżewski
