= Krzyżewski =

Prus coat of arms used by some of Krzyżewski family

Krzyżewski (Polish: [kʂɨˈʐɛfskʲi]; feminine: Krzyżewska, plural: Krzyżewscy) is a Polish family name. It is generally toponymic derived from Krzyżewo, Podlaskie Voivodeship but may also have origins in Krzyżewo, Braniewo County or Krzyżewo, Ełk County. Some of them use Prus coat of arms. Notable people with the surname include:

- Ewa Krzyżewska (1939–2003), Polish actress
- Mike Krzyzewski (born 1947), American former basketball coach (coached at Duke University)
- Krzyżewscy, aristocratic Polish family bearing the Grzymała coat of arms.
- Henryk Krzyżewski (1923–1988), Polish pedagogue
- Jan Krzyżewski, 18th-century Polish soldier
- Juliusz Krzyżewski (1915–1944), Polish poet
- Janusz Krzyżewski (1938–2003), Polish financial lawyer and economist
- Janusz Kazimierz Krzyżewski (born 1949), Polish politician
- Waldemar Krzyżewski (born 1953), Polish veterinarian

== See also ==
- Krzyżewo
