= Maków County =

Maków County Powiat makowski
- County
- Flag Coat of arms

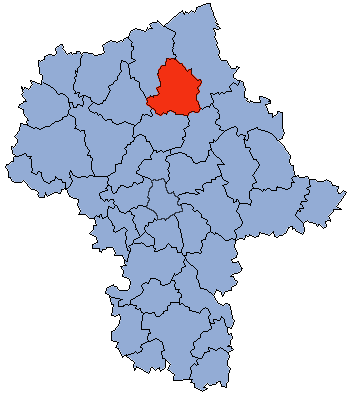
- Location within the voivodeship

- Division into gminas
- Coordinates (Maków Mazowiecki): 52°52′N 21°6′E
- Country: Poland
- Voivodeship: Masovian
- Seat: Maków Mazowiecki
- Gminas: Total 10 (incl. 1 urban): Maków Mazowiecki; Gmina Czerwonka; Gmina Karniewo; Gmina Krasnosielc; Gmina Młynarze; Gmina Płoniawy-Bramura; Gmina Różan; Gmina Rzewnie; Gmina Sypniewo; Gmina Szelków

Area
  - Total: 1,064.56 km^{2} (411.03 sq mi)

Population (2019)
  - Total: 45,076
  - Density: 42.342/km^{2} (109.67/sq mi)
  - Urban: 12,485
  - Rural: 32,591
- Car plates: WMA
- Website: www.powiat-makowski.pl

Maków County (Polish: powiat makowski) is a unit of territorial administration and local government (powiat) in Masovian Voivodeship, east-central Poland. It came into being on January 1, 1999, as a result of the Polish local government reforms passed in 1998. Its administrative seat and largest town is Maków Mazowiecki, which lies 73 kilometres (45 mi) north of Warsaw. The only other town in the county is Różan, lying 20 km (12 mi) east of Maków Mazowiecki.

The county covers an area of 1,064.56 square kilometres (411.0 sq mi). As of 2019 its total population is 45,076, out of which the population of Maków Mazowiecki is 9,776, that of Różan is 2,709, and the rural population is 32,591.

== History ==
On 21 August 2025, Maków County accepted a petition to enthrone Jesus Christ as King, and declared 21 June as "Day of Jesus Christ King of the Powiat". The Starosta of Maków County, Mirosław Augustyniak, criticized the passage of the law, stating it humiliated Maków in the eyes of Poland. Voivodeship authorities invalidated the law in September 2025.

== Neighbouring counties ==
Maków County is bordered by Ostrołęka County to the north-east, Wyszków County to the south-east, Pułtusk County to the south, Ciechanów County to the west and Przasnysz County to the north-west.

== Administrative divisions ==
The county is subdivided into 10 gminas (one urban, one urban-rural and eight rural). These are listed in the following table, in descending order of population.

Gmina	Type	Area (km^{2})	Population (2019)	Seat
Maków Mazowiecki	urban	10.3	9,776	
Gmina Krasnosielc	rural	167.0	6,399	Krasnosielc
Gmina Płoniawy-Bramura	rural	135.0	5,363	Płoniawy-Bramura
Gmina Karniewo	rural	129.4	5,189	Karniewo
Gmina Różan	urban-rural	84.1	4,411	Różan
Gmina Szelków	rural	112.9	3,659	Szelków
Gmina Sypniewo	rural	128.6	3,270	Sypniewo
Gmina Rzewnie	rural	111.7	2,625	Rzewnie
Gmina Czerwonka	rural	110.6	2,644	Czerwonka
Gmina Młynarze	rural	75.0	1,740	Młynarze
