= Dzyatlava massacre =

1942 mass killings of Jews

Coordinates: 53°27′N 25°24′E

Dzyatlava massacres
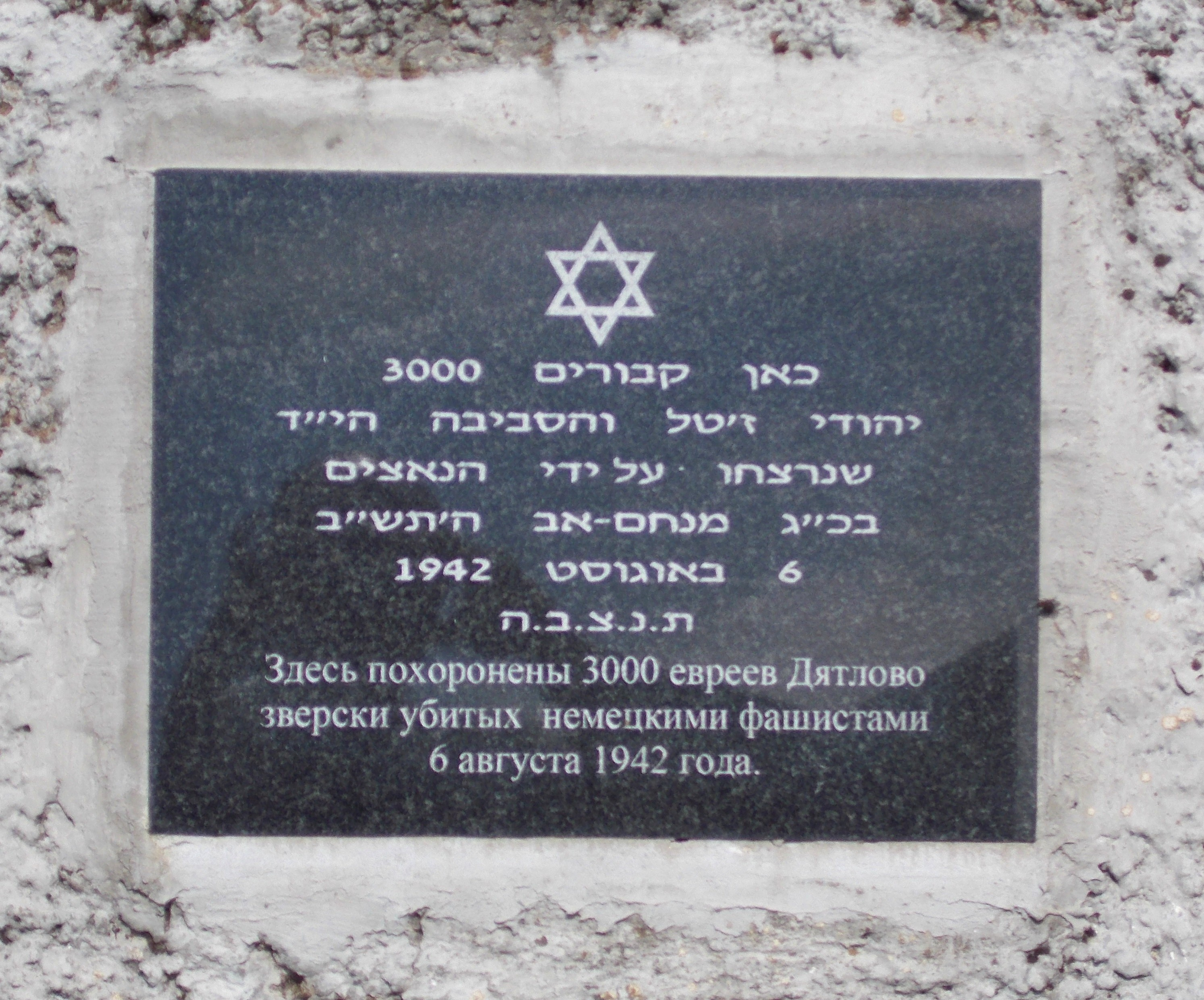
- Commemorative plaque to 3,000 victims of the Dzyatlava massacres.
- Also known as: Polish: zbrodnia w Dziatławie
- Location: Zdzięcioł (now, Dzyatlava) German-occupied Poland, present-day Belarus
- Date: April 30, 1942; August 10, 1942
- Incident type: Shootings by automatic and semi-automatic weapons
- Perpetrators: SS, Order Police battalions, Lithuanian and Belarusian Auxiliary Police
- Ghetto: Zdzięcioł Ghetto
- Victims: 3,000–5,000 Polish Jews in total

The Dzyatlava massacres were two consecutive mass shooting actions carried out three months apart during the Holocaust. The town of Zdzięcioł (Yiddish: זשעטל, romanized: Zhetel, Polish: Zdzięcioł, Belarusian: Dzyatlava) was located in the Nowogródek Voivodeship of the Second Polish Republic prior to World War II.

The German authorities created Zdzięcioł Ghetto in February 1942 and ordered over 4,500 Polish Jews to relocate there. Two months later, at the end of April 1942, the mobile German death squad aided by the Lithuanian and the Belarusian Auxiliary Police battalions, surrounded the ghetto and ordered all Jews to leave their houses to undergo a "selection". The victims were escorted to the main square and made to wait until the break of dawn. The next day, those who had work certificates were released along with their families, and all others were gradually taken out of town in groups for "relocation". In total, about 1,000–1,200 Jews were marched to the Kurpiasz (Kurpyash) forest and murdered in waves on April 30, 1942. The second massacre took place over three months later on August 6, 1942, during the liquidation of Zdzięcioł Ghetto. Some 1,500–2,000 Jews, possibly up to 3,000 by different source (perhaps a combined number), were murdered at the Jewish cemetery.

== The first massacre ==
On February 22, 1942, the German authorities put up posters around town announcing that all Jews had to move into the new ghetto, which was set up around the synagogue and the Talmud Torah building. On April 29, the Germans arrested the Judenrat and at dawn on April 30, the ghetto inmates were woken by shots inside the ghetto. The Germans announced through the Judenrat that all the Jews were to go to the old cemetery which was situated within the ghetto boundaries. At the same time, the Germans and their local Belarusian and Lithuanian collaborators began to drive the Jews out of their houses, beating, kicking and shooting those who were reluctant to obey. A selection was then carried out: women, children and the old were sent to the left, the young skilled workers to the right.

About 1,200 of those sent to the right were marched along the streets to the Kurpiasz (Kurpyash) Forest on the southern edge of town, where some pits had been prepared in advance. There the Germans shot them in groups of twenty. During the course of the shooting the German district commissar appeared and released those who had a certificate stating their profession, as well as their families. Thus about one hundred returned to the ghetto. The massacre was conducted by the Germans and local Belarusian police force.

== The second massacre ==
The second massacre started on August 10, 1942, and lasted for three days, as many Jews hid in prepared bunkers. During the course of the clearance of the ghetto, some 2,000 to 3,000 Jews were shot into three mass graves in the Jewish cemetery on the southern outskirts of Zdzięcioł, roughly 1,000 people in each. Just over 200 Jewish craftsmen were transferred to the ghetto in Nowogródek. This was the end of the ghetto and the end of the Jewish community of Zdzięcioł. Several hundred Jews, including the Kaplan family, who had hidden, fled once the massacre was over, some forming a family camp in the Nakryszki forest, where they managed to survive until the liberation.

Word spread among the Jews in the labor camps of Dworzec (Dworets), Nowogródek and other towns, about the Zhetel partisan detachment formed by the Soviets. A number of Jews (about 120 people) joined them at the Lipichany forests after their successful escape from the German massacre of August 1942. The Zhetler detachment commanded by Hirsch Kaplinski also in turn exacted revenge on local collaborators. One act of revenge took place in the village of Molery on September 10, 1942. After eliminating two collaborators, the Jewish partisans also informed the elder of the village and the local villagers about the precise reasons why they carried out this reprisal. It is estimated that about 370 Jewish partisans from Dzyatlava survived the war. Today, of the two Jewish cemeteries in the town, only one has some marked graves.

== See also ==
- List of massacres in Belarus during World War II
- Zdzięcioł Ghetto

== Books ==
- Gutman, Israel. Encyclopedia of the Holocaust. Macmillan, 1990. Page 374.
