= 30th Waffen Grenadier Division of the SS =

German infantry division

- 30. Waffen-Grenadier-Division der SS (German); 30-я вафэн-грэнадзёрская дывізія СС (Belarusian); 30-я добровольческая пехотная дивизия СС (Russian)
- Divisional insignia
- Active: 1 August 1944 – 15 April 1945
- Country: Nazi Germany
- Branch: Waffen-SS
- Type: Mechanized infantry
- Size: 10,000 (1944); 4,400 (1945)
- Part of: LXIII Army Corps, 19th Army; SS Führungshauptamt Reserve
- Nicknames: 1st Belarusian Division; 2nd Russian Division
- Engagements: World War II; Siegfried Line campaign

Commanders
- Notable commanders: Hans Siegling

The 30th Waffen Grenadier Division of the SS (1st Belarusian), (Note: German: 30. Waffen-Grenadier-Division der SS (weißruthenische Nr. 1) Belarusian: 30-я вафэн-грэнадзёрская дывізія СС (1-я беларуская), romanized: 30-ya vafen-hrenadzyorskaya dyviziya SS (1-ya belaruskaya)) originally called the 30th Waffen Grenadier Division of the SS (2nd Russian), (Note: German: 30. Waffen-Grenadier-Division der SS (russische Nr. 2) Russian: 30-я добровольческая пехотная дивизия СС (2-я русская), romanized: 30-ya dobrovolcheskaya pekhotnaya diviziya SS (2-ya russkaya)) was a short-lived Waffen-SS mechanized infantry division of Nazi Germany formed largely from Belarusian, Russian, and Ukrainian personnel of the Schutzmannschaft-Brigade Siegling in August 1944 at Warsaw in the General Government.

In the summer of 1944, the SS decided to form Russian divisions. The 30th Waffen Grenadier Division had two iterations. The first was as the 2nd Russian division, which was formed in August 1944. In January 1945, the Russian personnel of the division were transferred to Andrey Vlasov's Russian Liberation Army, and became part of the 600th Infantry Division (the 1st Division of the Russian Liberation Army). The remaining members of the unit were reorganized as the Waffen Grenadier Brigade of the SS (1st Belarusian) (German: Waffen-Grenadier-Brigade der SS (weißruthenische Nr. 1)). In March 1945, the brigade was once again renamed the 30th Waffen Grenadier Division, this time designated as the 1st Belarusian division.

Many former members of auxiliary police units and the Belarusian Home Guard that were created by the Germans in occupied Belarus fled westward as the Soviets advanced in mid-1944. These, along with some Ukrainian, Russian, and Cossack units, were combined into a brigade commanded by Hans Siegling in Poland, which was reorganized as the 30th Waffen Grenadier Division of the SS before going to France. Division personnel included new recruits as well as older veterans of the Russian Imperial Army, or the Red Army. The division was commanded primarily by German officers, with non-German officers serving as assistants.

Throughout the entire history of the division there were tensions and distrust between the German and non-German personnel, and desertions began early on as the unit was being formed in early to mid-August 1944. Even though the division's members took an oath to fight against Bolshevism, the unit was transferred from Poland to the Western Front in late August, which undermined morale further. Shortly after their arrival, two battalions of the division murdered their German officers and defected to the French resistance, and more desertions followed. Despite this, the 30th division fought in combat against partisans and later against French and American forces during the Allied advance to the German border, being noted for destroying several tanks. In January 1945, it was withdrawn to Germany and did not see any more combat, before surrendering at the end of the war to the U.S. Third Army.

== Background ==
As the Red Army advanced during Operation Bagration in mid-1944 through German-occupied Belarus, those who collaborated with Germany in the auxiliary police battalions or the Belarusian Home Guard fled westward. Some of them stayed in Belarus and later even joined the Red Army, due to the fact that the Soviet partisans encouraged defections and because the Germans saw the auxiliary police as expendable. Those who retreated with the Germans ended up in East Prussia, where the surviving anti-Soviet partisan police units were reorganized and combined into the Schutzmannschaft-Brigade Siegling, named for its commander, SS-Lieutenant Colonel Hans Siegling. He had been the last SS and police leader of White Ruthenia. Later, control of the brigade passed from the police to the Waffen-SS, though Siegling remained in command of the formation. In February 1944 the Siegling Brigade also received two Ukrainian auxiliary police battalions while it was in Eylau, East Prussia, along with other Russian, Cossack, and Belarusian units.

As the tide of the war turned against Germany, in the summer of 1944 the SS leadership showed an interest in creating Russian and other Slavic divisions despite their racial beliefs about Slavs. In May 1944, Heinrich Himmler gave a speech to the SS Galicia Division in which he said that the Germans are equal to the Ukrainians and acknowledged their Ukrainian national identity. In the same month, Gottlob Berger, the head of the SS Main Office, established the 'eastern volunteers guiding office' (German: Freiwilligen-Leitstelle Ost) under the leadership of Fritz Rudolf Arlt. It was organized into departments for each individual nationality with the goal of increasing their recruitment for the Waffen-SS. Gottlob and other SS officials met with Andrey Vlasov, the head of the Russian Liberation Army, to discuss the usage of Russian volunteers against the Soviets. Vlasov wanted to have all 'eastern' units under his command. But this was opposed by Radasłaŭ Astroŭski, the leader of the Belarusian Central Council, and other Belarusian nationalists working with the Germans, who wanted an independent Belarus and saw Vlasov's movement as an attempt to restore the Russian Empire. Astroŭski, who arrived in Berlin in early July 1944 from Belarus and saw himself as the leader of a government-in-exile, asked the German leadership to create a Belarusian legion to continue fighting the Soviets, which influenced the decision to create the 30th Waffen Grenadier Division.

== Formation and initial organization ==
On 31 July 1944 orders were issued to form a division from the personnel of the Schutzmannschaft-Brigade Siegling, who were subsequently organized into four infantry regiments (numbered 1 through 4). The initial organization of the division also included an artillery battalion, a cavalry battalion, and a training battalion. At this time, the division's full name was 30. Waffen-Grenadier-Division der SS (russische Nr. 2). The term "Waffen-Grenadier der SS" was used to denote SS infantry divisions manned by personnel of other-than-German ethnicity, to get around the organization's racial policies, as they were subordinated to the SS but not considered fully part of it. Partly from this, the level of camaraderie between the German and non-German members of the division was not very high. The families of enlisted members were sent to work in Germany, officers. There were desertions from the 30th division as early as its training phase in August 1944.

Although the division was designated as Russian, its members included Belarusians, Russians, and Ukrainians. The officer corps was primarily German, though it also included non-Germans, who had originally been trained for the Belarusian Home Defence. The latter were most often assistants to German commanders. The division had about 10,000 troops.

In mid-August 1944, the division was moved by rail to northeastern France near Belfort and Mulhouse. By October, the organization of the division had been altered to three infantry regiments of three battalions each, a motorcycle (reconnaissance) battalion, an artillery battalion, and a field replacement battalion. The artillery battalion consisted of two batteries of captured 122-mm Soviet artillery pieces.

== Mutiny and desertion ==
The 30th Waffen Grenadier Division arrived in Strasbourg on 18 August 1944, to support the Wehrmacht's 19th Army in holding northeast France by performing anti-partisan operations, at which point elements of the division (the 102nd battalion) were sent to Vesoul on 20 August and were charged with the security of the Belfort Gap, particularly against operations conducted by the French Forces of the Interior (FFI). The same day, other elements of the division (the 118th battalion) occupied the area around Camp du Valdahon, about thirty kilometers southeast of Besançon.

Subsequent events demonstrated the division's lack of loyalty to the German cause. On 27 August 1944, under the direction of Major Lev (Leon) Hloba, (Note: Lev Hloba (24 April 1924 – 31 December 2012) made the decision to defect while training in Germany. Afterwards he served in the FFI and the French Foreign Legion, also working with the Office of Strategic Services (OSS), before moving to Canada in 1951.) two battalions of the division, including at Vesoul, shot their German leadership cadre and defected to an FFI unit in the Confracourt forest, bringing 818 men, 45-mm antitank guns, 82-mm and 50-mm mortars, 21 heavy machine guns, as well as large amounts of small arms and small-calibre ammunition. A similar defection occurred the same day near Camp Valdahon and brought over hundreds of men, one antitank gun, eight heavy machine guns, four mortars, and small arms and ammunition. The defectors were subsequently inducted into the FFI as the 1st and 2nd Ukrainian Battalions and many were later amalgamated into the 13th Demi-Brigade of Foreign Legion, itself subordinated to the 1st Free French Division.

On 28 August 1944, Field Marshal Walter Model, the German supreme commander on the Western Front, sent a message to the SS Main Office telling them that division members were "deserting in battalions to the bands, killing German officers; completely unreliable." He recommended that the 30th division be disarmed and its members be sent to Germany as construction laborers.

On 29 August 1944, the first and third battalions of the division's 4th Regiment deserted and crossed the border into Switzerland.

On 2 September, two squadrons (companies) of the division's cavalry battalion (formerly Kosaken-Schuma-Abteilung 68 and redesignated the Waffen-Reiter-Abteilung der SS 30) were surrounded and destroyed in a surprise attack at Melin by the Ukrainians who had defected in the Confracourt woods.

The subsequent investigation of these events by German authorities resulted in some 2,300 men in the division being deemed "unreliable". As punishment, these personnel were transferred to two field entrenchment construction regiments (German: Schanzregiment) and were used to help build the Western Wall, leaving some 5,500 to 6,200 men still in the division. The extraordinary events in the division also led to it being placed in Army Group G reserve and being viewed by senior German leadership in Alsace as an unreliable unit.

The 30th Waffen-SS Division's time in the Alsace from late September to November 1944 was dedicated to raising the morale of the troops and making it more combat capable. On 15 September 1944, the commander of the Muravyov Battalion issued Order No. 1 in Russian with the intention of stopping desertions. It spoke of a German victory and claimed that those former members that defected to the French resistance had been given to the Soviets. However, morale remained low in the division and there were discipline problems. Other efforts to raise morale included awarding to the Ostvolk Medal to soldiers who were successful in anti-partisan operations, training in shooting and marching, and lectures given to members of the division on the connection between the Western Allies and Bolshevism, to motivate them to fight. Despite all of these efforts, the 30th division continued to have severe problems, made worse by a lack of basic supplies and food, causing the unit to plunder nearby French villages. There was also a shortage of artillery and armor.

On 24 October 1944, the division had reorganized into three regiments, numbered 75 to 77 (designated Russian 4 to 6), each of two infantry battalions. This organization accorded with the orders for the formation of the division that had been issued in August 1944 by the SS Führungshauptamt. Because of losses, however, the 77th Regiment was disbanded on 2 November.

== Combat ==
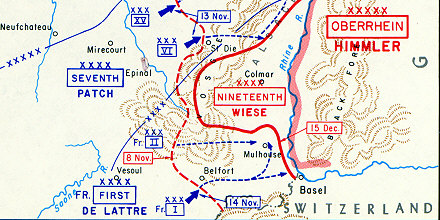
The advance of Alexander Patch's U.S. 7th Army and Jean de Lattre de Tassigny's French 1st Army in the Belfort Gap.

The success of the French breakthrough in the Belfort Gap starting on 13 November 1944 created a crisis in the German defences from Belfort to Mulhouse. Siegling offered the use of the 30th Waffen Grenadier Division to the 19th Army, tasked with defending the area. Because of its previous mutiny, the 19th Army rejected its deployment to the front, insisting that it be used for security in the rear. With defending units under severe pressure by the French advance, the Germans committed the 30th Waffen-SS Division to counterattack the French at Seppois. The advance of the SS unit on 19 November reached a point roughly a mile north of Seppois, but was held there and pushed back by French counterattacks. On 22 November 1944, the unit fought against the French 1st Armored Division and was credited with destroying six tanks. The war diary of German Supreme Command West noted their success and included praise for the bravery of the 30th Waffen Grenadier Division. The division then went on the defensive in the area around Altkirch on the instructions of Himmler, where it was subordinated to the LXIII Army Corps. The division's Regiment 76 was used to hold the Altkirch–Hirtzbach line while Regiment 75 was along the Rhône–Rhine Canal.

As the German situation in lower Alsace solidified into what would become known as the Colmar Pocket, the 30th Waffen Grenadier Division of the SS remained in the German front line north of Huningue and west of the Rhine River. As the fighting went on, there were shortages of artillery, and the 30th division had to face French armor with only infantry weapons. In late November the unit began collapsing and abandoning its positions, at which point Siegling concluded that it was no longer combat capable. In late December 1944, with its manpower down to 4,400 men, the division was withdrawn from the front and ordered to the Grafenwöhr training area deep inside of Germany.

== Disbandment and second formation ==
Orders to disband the division were issued on 1 January 1945, and the division arrived at Grafenwöhr on 11 January. Russian personnel in the division were transferred to the 600th Infantry Division, a unit of Russians organized by Nazi Germany and belonging to the Russian Liberation Army.

On 15 January 1945, the non-Russian personnel of the division were organized into the 1st Belarusian Waffen Grenadier Brigade of the SS, a unit that had only a single regiment of infantry (the 75th) with three battalions as well as some other units such as an artillery battalion and a cavalry battalion. The brigade did not see any combat.

While still organizing, the brigade was retitled the 30th Waffen Grenadier Division (1st Belarusian) (German: 30. Waffen-Grenadier-Division der SS (weissruthenische Nr. 1)) on 9 March 1945, but it still had only a single regiment of infantry. Finally, in April 1945, this iteration of the division was also disbanded, with the German cadre being sent to the 25th and 38th SS Grenadier Divisions. The remaining Belarusian members of the 30th division were captured by the Third United States Army at the Grafenwöhr camp, and were sent to a POW camp in Regensburg, Bavaria. The survivors were able to emigrate to Western countries after the war, in part because of the fact many of them came from a part of Belarus that was part of Poland before World War II. The majority of its former Ukrainian members that defected to the French resistance enlisted in the Foreign Legion at the end of the war to avoid being repatriated to the Soviet Union. The Russian former members that joined Vlasov's Russian Liberation Army later turned against the Germans and fought them in the Prague uprising, before falling into Soviet captivity.

== Legacy ==
After the 2020–2021 Belarusian protests, the Ministry of Internal Affairs of Belarus added the slogan "Long Live Belarus!" to its list of Nazi slogans and symbols in November 2022 because it was allegedly used by the 30th Waffen Grenadier Division. The slogan was widely used by protestors following the 2020 Belarusian presidential election. The saying was first written in 1906 by the poet Yanka Kupala.

== Names ==
The division went through several iterations and used the following names:

- 30. Waffen-Grenadier-Division der SS (russische Nr. 2) – August to December 1944.
- Waffen-Grenadier-Brigade der SS (weißruthenische Nr. 1) – January to March 1945.
- 30. Waffen-Grenadier-Division der SS (weißruthenische Nr. 1) – March to May 1945.

=== Structure ===
From October to December 1944:

- Waffen-Grenadier-Regiment der SS 75 (russisches Nr. 4)
- Waffen-Grenadier-Regiment der SS 76 (russisches Nr. 5)
- Waffen-Grenadier-Regiment der SS 77 (russisches Nr. 6)
  - Russisches Bataillon Nr. 654
  - Bataillon Murawjew
- Waffen-Artillerie-Regiment der SS 30
  - SS-Aufklärungs-Abteilung 30
  - SS-Artillerie-Abteilung 30
  - SS-Panzerjäger-Abteilung 30
  - SS-Feldersatz-Bataillon
    - Reiter-Schwadron 30
    - SS-Pionier-Kompanie 30
    - SS-Sanitäts-Kompanie
    - SS-Panzerspäh-Kompanie
    - SS-Füsilier-Kompanie

From January to May 1945:

- Waffen-Grenadier-Regiment der SS 75 (I. – III.)
- Artillerie-Abteilung
- Panzerjäger-Abteilung
- Reiter-Schwadron

== Commanders ==
No.	Portrait	Commander	Took office	Left office	Time in office
1	Hans Siegling	SS Obersturmbannführer; Hans Siegling (1912–after 1975)	August 1944	15 April 1945	257 days

== See also ==
- List of German divisions in World War II
- List of Waffen-SS divisions
- List of SS personnel
