= Schutzmannschaft-Brigade Siegling =

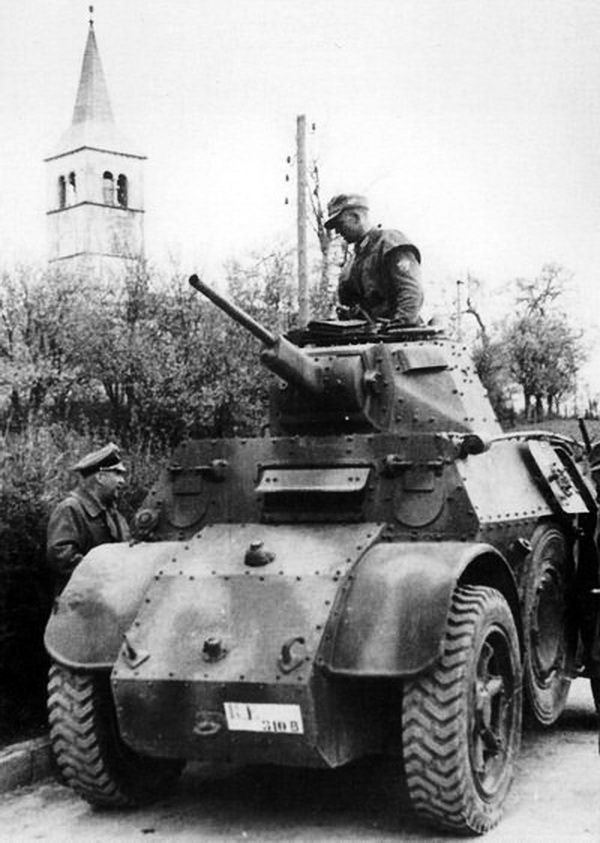
- Armoured vehicle of the Belarusian; Schutzmannschaft-Brigade Siegling
- Active: July – August 1944
- Country: Nazi Germany
- Type: Auxiliary police
- Role: Nazi security warfare
- Size: Brigade

Commanders
- Notable commanders: Hans Siegling

Schutzmannschaft-Brigade Siegling (also German: Schutzmänner-Brigade Siegling; lit. 'Siegling's Auxiliary Police Brigade') was a Belarusian Auxiliary Police brigade formed by Nazi Germany in July 1944 in East Prussia, from six auxiliary police battalions (60th and 64th Belarusian and the 57th, 61st, 62nd and 63rd Ukrainian) following Operation Bagration.

== Background ==
Most members of the Schutzmannschaft-Brigade Siegling originated from the pro-Nazi Belarusian Home Defence (BKA). The total number of soldiers evacuated by the Nazis to East Prussia from across Belarus during the Soviet advance might have reached 10,000. They regrouped northeast of Warsaw in German-occupied Poland, under the command of SS-Obersturmbannführer Hans Siegling who was also the SS and police leader of Generalbezirk Weissruthenien. The new Brigade consisted of four rifle regiments as well as artillery and cavalry units. It was renamed by Himmler in August 1944, as the 30th Waffen Grenadier Division of the SS.

It consisted of men from the German-occupied territories of the Soviet Union, mainly from Belarus, including whole local military headquarters (Kommandantura) of Belarusian Home Defence and members of Andrey Vlasov's Russian Liberation Army, but also units of the German Sicherheitspolizei (SiPo), Sicherheitsdienst (SD), and Ordnungsdienst from the area.

By November 1944, the battalion whose formation started in August originally – as the Schuma Brigade Siegling – was transported to France as the 30th Waffen Grenadier Division of the SS (2nd Russian). While in France, the brigade remained under the leadership of Hans Siegling. By 10 February 1945 the formation was nearly wiped out by mass Belarusian desertion and by the Allies. Only one regiment was left. Some reinforcements came from other formations, but not enough. The battalion was renamed again as the 30th SS Grenadier Division (1st White Ruthenian) or Weißruthenische Nr. 1 (in German), but in April 1945, it was entirely disbanded.

== Formation of Schuma Brigade Siegling ==
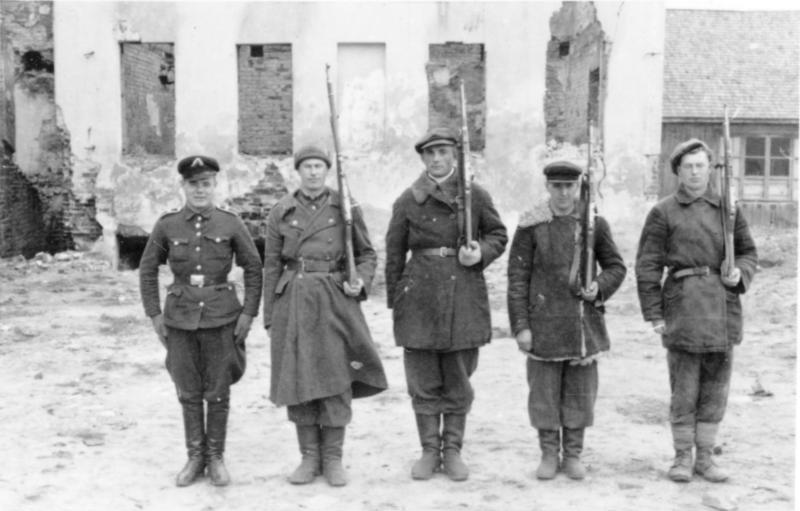
Belarusian Shuma in March 1943

The German forces along with the Ukrainian, Belarusian, and Russian collaborators under the German command were pushed out of the Byelorussian SSR during the Soviet Operation Bagration of August 1944. They gradually retreated west from the GK Weißruthenien (as it was called then) toward occupied eastern Poland between June 22 and August 19. Dozens of units remained scattered around. The German forces included remnants of the SiPo, SD, and Ordnungsdienst. Among them, were also units of Byelorussian Home Defence (BKA) and the Belarusian Kommandantura personnel. At the end of June 1944, the SS commander Curt von Gottberg issued an order to create the Schutzmannschaft-Brigade Siegling which by July 20 was formed and prepared for duty.

The formation of the brigade's four regiments was completed by July 31 – all four regiments, named after their commanders, were stationed at that time in different places:

- 1st Regiment at Grady (Sturmbannführer Hans Österreich)
- 2nd Regiment at Stawicz (commander Sturmbannführer Helmuth Gantz)
- 3rd Regiment at Czartoriak (commander Sturmbannführer Wilhelm Mocha)
- 4th Regiment (commander Sturmbannführer Ernst Schmidt)
- An artillery unit was stationed at Suliny

The brigade also had a cavalry unit. The approximate number of the personnel is estimated as follows: up to 6 thousand auxiliary Ordnungspolizei, 2,000 SD men, and up to 8,000 members of the BKA. They were spread over many locations in East Prussia.

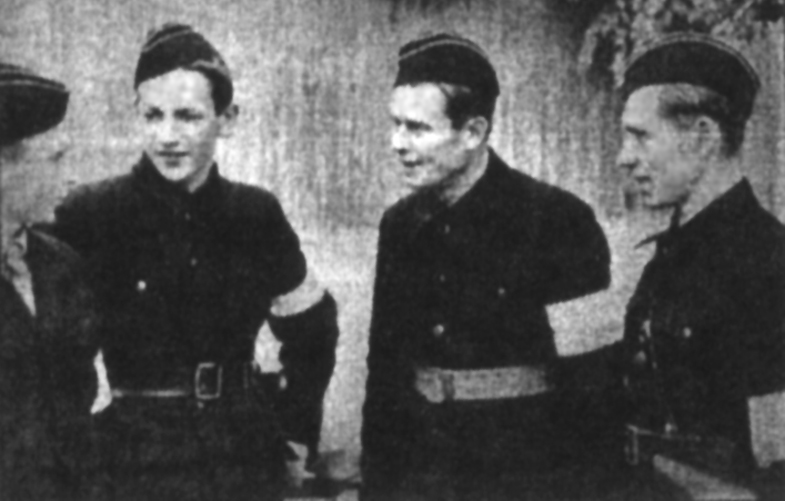
Belarusian Auxiliary Police Battalion Siegling in 1944

Schutzmannschaft-Brigade Siegling in its full formation operated in Belarus from late July 1944. In August 1944 (possibly earlier) an order was issued to form a division formation from Brigade Siegling - thus all personnel were transferred from the rank-and-file of the Ordnungspolizei formations to the SS command. Under the new leadership, the brigade was renamed the 30th Waffen Grenadier Division of the SS (2nd Russian) on August 18, 1944. The Division was composed of the following regiments:

- Waffen-Gren.Rgt. d. SS 75 (russ. Nr. 4)
- Waffen-Gren.Rgt. d. SS 76 (russ. Nr. 5) (consisted of three battalions each)
- Waffen-Artillerie-Rgt d. SS 30 (russ. Art.Rgt. 2) (consisted of three artillery batteries)
- Replacement Regiment

The combat-ready units of the Brigade Siegling were transferred to France to participate in operations against the French Resistance.

The transfer of all units in a brigade-size formation to France was decided under the general command of Obersturmbannführer Hans Siegling. Siegling led dozens of Nazi security warfare operations in Belarus since 1941 as the commander of the 57th Auxiliary Police Battalion.

On 6 August 1944, the unit received an order to take part in the suppression of the Warsaw Uprising, however, the idea was abandoned. Instead, it was used from August 12 in East Prussia for the harvest collection. Some combat-ready units of the brigade were transferred to France in August 1944 to fight against the French Resistance.

== War Crimes ==
In February 1943 members of the 57th Auxiliary Police Battalion under Hans Siegling were involved in a massacre of Jews and Russian Partisans in February 1943 in a cowshed in Salihorsk, Belarus. On 11 August 1973, a military court in Minsk sentenced 4 Belarusian members of the 57th Battalion to death for killing the partisans.Those tried were Iwan Melnikowitsch; Pjotr Kutusow; Nikolai Skrobez; Iwan Chlebowitsch

== See also ==
- 29th Waffen Grenadier Division of the SS RONA (1st Russian)
- 30th Waffen Grenadier Division of the SS
- Holocaust in Belarus
- Belarusian Auxiliary Police
- Schutzmannschaft Battalion 118, joint operations

== Bibliography ==
- Rein, Leonid (2007). "Untermenschen in SS Uniforms: 30th Waffen-Grenadier Division of Waffen SS". The Journal of Slavic Military Studies. 20 (2): 329–345. doi:10.1080/13518040701378360. ISSN 1556-3006. S2CID 144741225.
- Rein, Leonid (2011). "Chapter 8: Military-Police Collaboration in Byelorussia". The Kings and the Pawns: Collaboration in Byelorussia during World War II. Berghahn Books. ISBN 978-0857450432.
- Bishop, C. (2006). Zagraniczne formacje SS. Zagraniczni ochotnicy w Waffen-SS w latach 1940–1945 (in Polish). Warszawa.
