= Borowce =

Borowce refers to the following places in Poland:

- Borowce, Masovian Voivodeship
- Borowce, Silesian Voivodeship
