= Viačasłaŭ Adamčyk =

Belarusian journalist and writer

- Вячасла́ў Уладзі́міравіч Ада́мчык
- Born: November 1, 1933
- Died: August 5, 2001 (aged 67); Minsk, Belarus

Viačasłaŭ Uładzimieravič Adamčyk (Belarusian: Вячасла́ў Уладзі́міравіч Ада́мчык, Russian: Вячесла́в Влади́мирович Ада́мчик) (1 November 1933 – 5 August 2001) was a Belarusian journalist and writer.

He worked in the newspaper The Banner of Youth (1957–1958) and For the Return to their Homeland (1958–1960). He was then editor of the BSSR State Publishing House (1960–1962), and editor of the journalism magazine Polymya (1962–1963). He graduated from the higher literature courses at the Writers' Union in Moscow in 1965. He then worked for the magazine Nyoman (1965–1967), and was head of the editorial board of Polymya (1967–1969). He was deputy chief editor of the magazine Youth, where he worked from 1969 to 1977. He participated in the XXXVIII General Assembly of the United Nations in 1983.

He made his debut in 1952 with poetry, but his first story was published in 1957. He was the author of the collections of prose The Insider (1958), The Milky Way (1960), A Moment Flashes (1965), The Wild Dove (1972), Day Early Fall (1974).

== Biography ==
He was born into a peasant family in the village of Vorokomshchina (now in the Dzyatlava District, Grodno Region, Belarus).

He graduated from a 7-year school in Navayelnya (Dyatlovsky district) (1949). He worked as a loader at the Novelnya railway station and at the same time studied at evening school. In 1952-1957 he studied at the journalism department of the philological faculty of the Belarusian State University.

For some time, he lived in Dzyarzhynsk (Koidanovo) in the Minsk Region, where his son Vladimir (writer Adam Hlobus) was born.

He worked in the newspapers “The Banner of Youth” (1957-1958), “For the Return to their Homeland” (1958-1960), was the editor of the State Publishing House of the Belarusian SSR (1960-1962), editor of the journalism department of the literary magazine “Polymya” (1962-1963) .

He graduated from the Higher Literary Courses at the Union of Soviet Writers in Moscow (1965).

He worked as a literary employee of the magazine Nyoman (1965-1967), deputy editor of the magazine "Polymya" (1967-1969), editor of the prose department, deputy editor-in-chief of the magazine "Youth" (1969-1977), editor-in-chief of the stage workshop at the film studio "Belarusfilm" "(1977-1980), deputy editor-in-chief of the publishing house "Fiction" (1980-1982). Since 1982 - editor-in-chief of the "Byarozka" magazine.

He took part in the XXXVIII session of the UN General Assembly (1983).

He died on August 5, 2001 in Minsk. Sons: Adam Hlobus and Mirosław Adamczyk, Belarusian writers.
