= Dzyatlava =

Town in Grodno Region, Belarus

Dzyatlava Дзятлава (Belarusian)
- Town
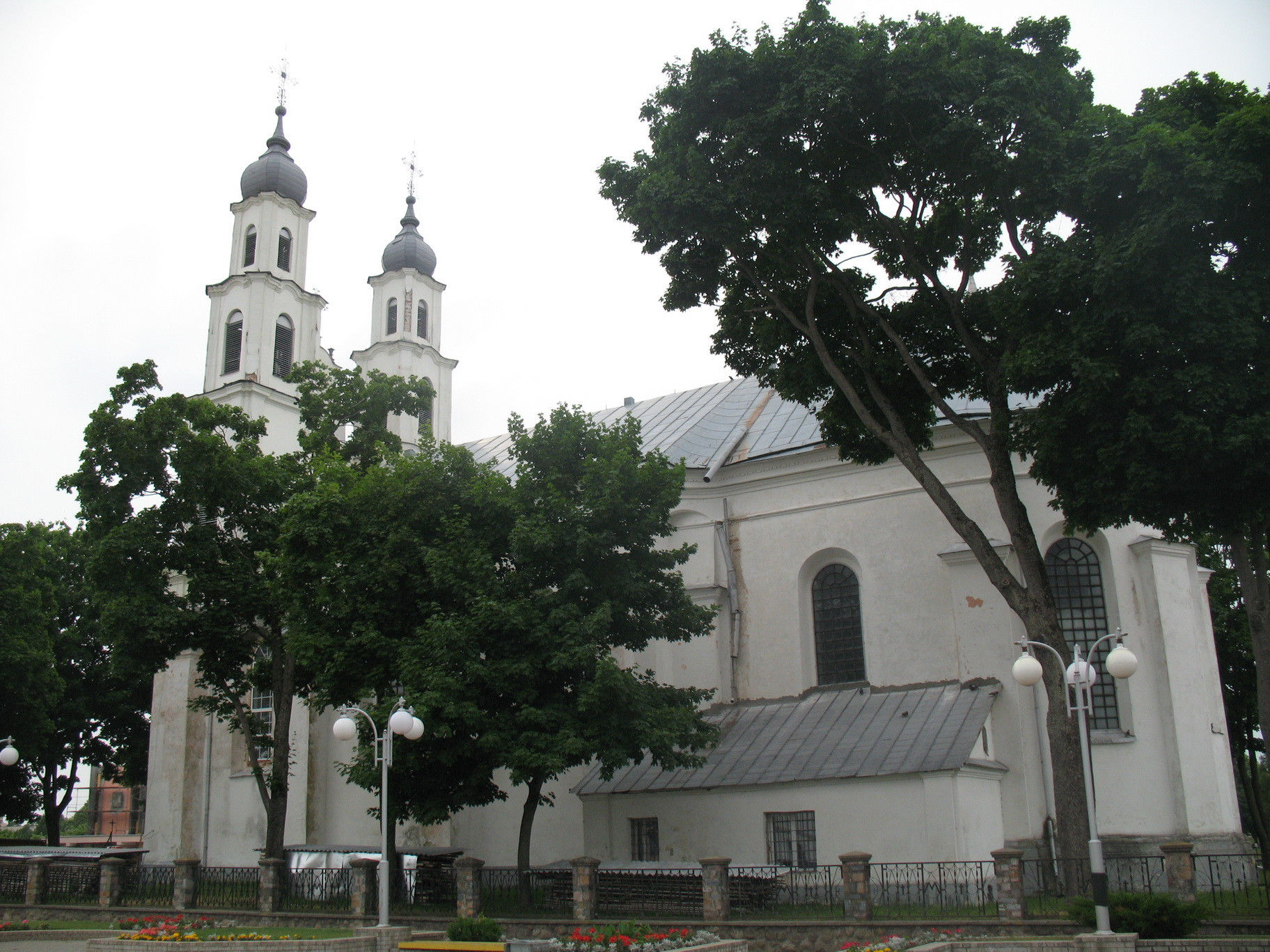
- Catholic Church of the Assumption of Mary founded by Sejm Marshal Lew Sapieha

- Flag Coat of arms

- Location within Belarus
- Coordinates: 53°27′55″N 25°24′20″E
- Country: Belarus
- Region: Grodno Region
- District: Dzyatlava District
- Founded: 1498

Population (2025)
  - Total: 7,596
- Time zone: UTC+3 (MSK)
- Postal code: 231471
- Area code: +375 1563
- Website: dyatlovo.grodno-region.by/en/

Dzyatlava or Dyatlovo (Note: Belarusian: Дзятлава, romanized: Dziatlava; Russian: Дятлово; Polish: Zdzięcioł; Yiddish: זשעטל, romanized: Zhetl.) is a town in Grodno Region, Belarus. It serves as the administrative center of Dzyatlava District. It is located about 165 kilometres (103 mi) southeast of Grodno. The population was 7,700 in 2016. As of 2025, it has a population of 7,596.

== History ==
Being 80 kilometres south of present-day Lithuania, Zietela's environs had been known by linguists as the outermost indigenous Lithuanian speaking "island" apart from the contiguous Lithuanian language territory. The Lithuanian speakers spoke a unique dialect, known as the "Zietela dialect"; it has been speculated that the ancestors of its speakers might have been Lithuanized Jotvingians. It drew the attention by many prominent linguists, such as Christian Schweigaard Stang, Vladimir Toporov, Kazimieras Būga and Juozas Balčikonis. In 1886, 1,156 people in nearby villages declared themselves Lithuanians, however, the real number might have been much greater. At present the Lithuanian population is virtually extinct.

=== Grand Duchy of Lithuania ===
Zietela was first referenced in documents from 1498 when it was granted by the King of Poland John I Albert to Prince Konstanty Ostrogski, who later built a wooden castle there.

==== 17th century ====
In the 17th century, Zietela was owned by Lew Sapieha, who ordered a Catholic church to be erected on the main city square. The church was consecrated in 1646, renovated after a fire in 1743 and still stands.

==== 18th century ====
During the Great Northern War of the anti-Swedish alliance, Peter I of Russia visited Zietela and stayed there for a week in January 1708. In the 18th century, the town was owned by Stanisław Sołtyk, who built a Baroque residence there in 1751. After the partitions of Poland, until the aftermath of World War I, the town was within the Russian Empire, in the Grodno Governorate, district of Slonim.

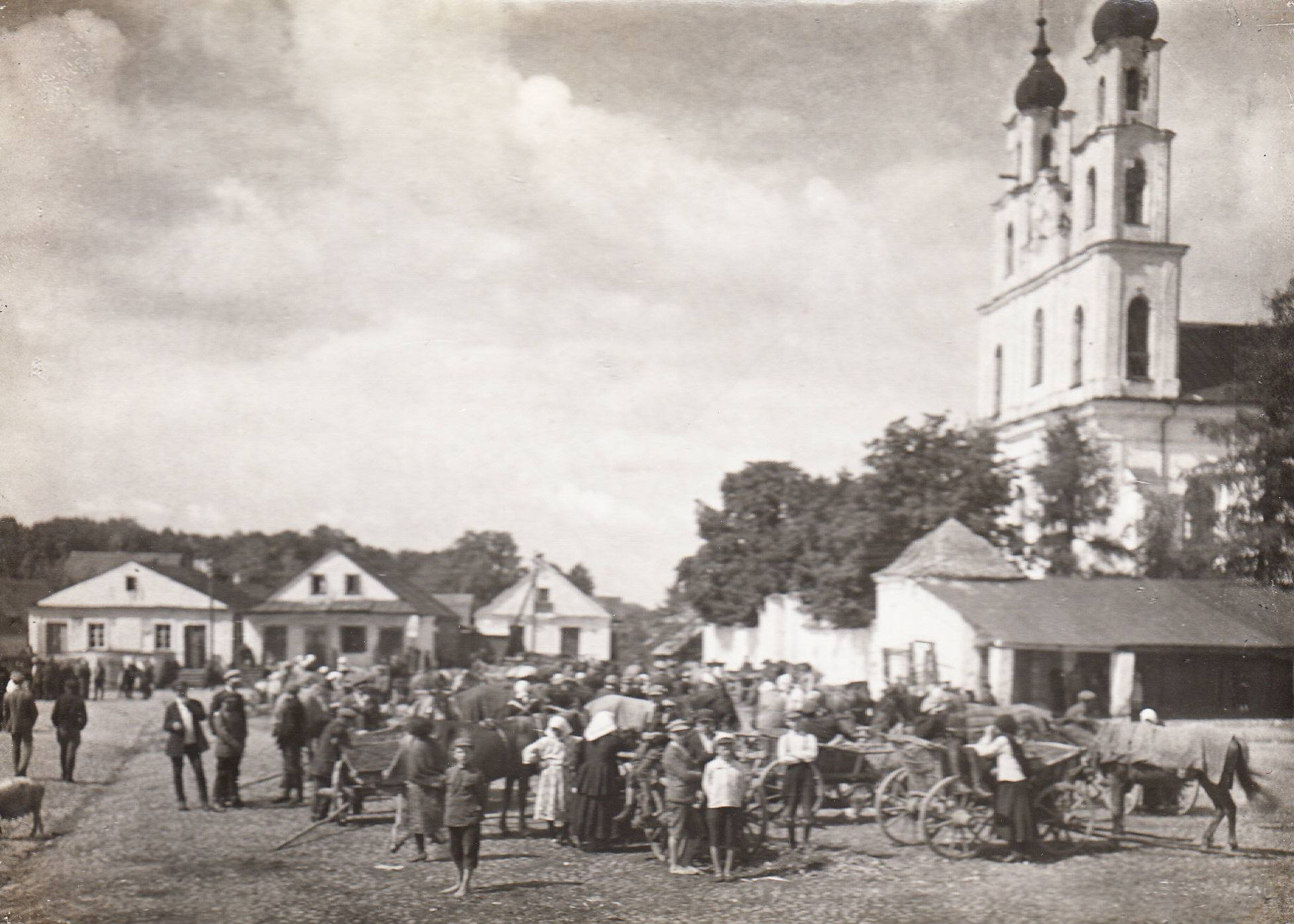
Market square in Zdzięcioł, 1938, before the Soviet invasion of Poland

=== 20th century ===
Between World War I and World War II, Zdzięcioł (now Dzyatlava) belonged to the Second Polish Republic. It was the seat of Gmina Zdzięcioł in Nowogródek Voivodeship. The population was composed predominantly of Polish Jews. The Soviet forces invaded eastern Poland on September 17, 1939, and stationed in the Voivodeship area until the outbreak of their own war with Germany in June 1941. After the Soviet rapid retreat, and several months of Nazi ad hoc persecution, on February 22, 1942 the new German authorities officially created Zdzięcioł Ghetto.

During the Holocaust, about 3,000–5,000 Jews were killed near the town during the Dzyatlava massacre of 1942 by a German death squad aided by the Lithuanian and the Belarusian Auxiliary Police battalions. The old Jewish cemetery is considered a minor landmark.

== Notable people ==
- Ivan Karizna, cellist
- Jacob ben Wolf Kranz of Dubno, the "Dubner maggid" (1741–1804)
- Yisrael Meir Kagan (Chofetz Chayim), 1839–1933
- Zvi Yosef Resnick, rabbi and rosh yeshivah (1841–1912)
- Mnachem Risikoff, rabbi and scholar (1866–1960), born in Dzyatlava
- Dovid Leibowitz, founder of Yeshivas Chofetz Chaim (1887–1941), born in Dzyatlava
- Baruch Sorotzkin (1917-1979)
- Tamara Lazakovich, European All-Around Co-Champion (1971) and Olympic medalist (1972) in gymnastics
