= 64th Belarusian Auxiliary Police Battalion =

- Active: 1 February 1944 — June 1944
- Size: 65 (29 February 1944)
- Garrison: Hlybokaye, Generalbezirk Weissruthenien, Reichskommissariat Ostland

64th Belarusian Auxiliary Police Battalion (Belarusian: 64-ы батальён дапаможнай паліцыі, romanized: 64-y bataĺjon dapamožnaj palicyi; German: Weiss-Schutzmannschaft-Bataillon F/64) was a Belarusian Auxiliary Police battalion that existed in 1944, at the very end of the German occupation of Byelorussia during World War II. It was composed from the Belarusians of Hlybokaye.

== History ==
On 1 February 1944, the 64th Auxiliary Police Battalion was formed in Hlybokaye as a guard (Wacht) battalion. In May 1944, the battalion received the status of a field battalion (Feld). Most likely, the battalion never became a fighting unit, because it had only 65 people as of 29 February 1944. In June, the battalion was evacuated to German-occupied Poland due to the Soviet Operation Bagration that pushed the Wehrmacht out of Belarus. Later, the battalion became part of the Siegling Brigade's 2nd Regiment.

== Sources ==
- Hryboŭski, Jury (2007). "Беларускі легіён СС: міфы і рэчаіснасць" [The Belarusian SS Legion: Myths and Reality]. Belarusian Historical Review (in Belarusian). 14 (1–2).
- Romanko, O. V. (2008). Коричневые тени в Полесье : Белоруссия, 1941-1945 [Brown shadows in Polesie: Belarus, 1941-1945] (PDF). Военные тайны ХХ века (in Russian). Moscow: Veche. ISBN 9785953319096.
