= Dzyatlava Ghetto =

Nazi ghetto in occupied Belarus

Coordinates: 53°27′N 25°24′E

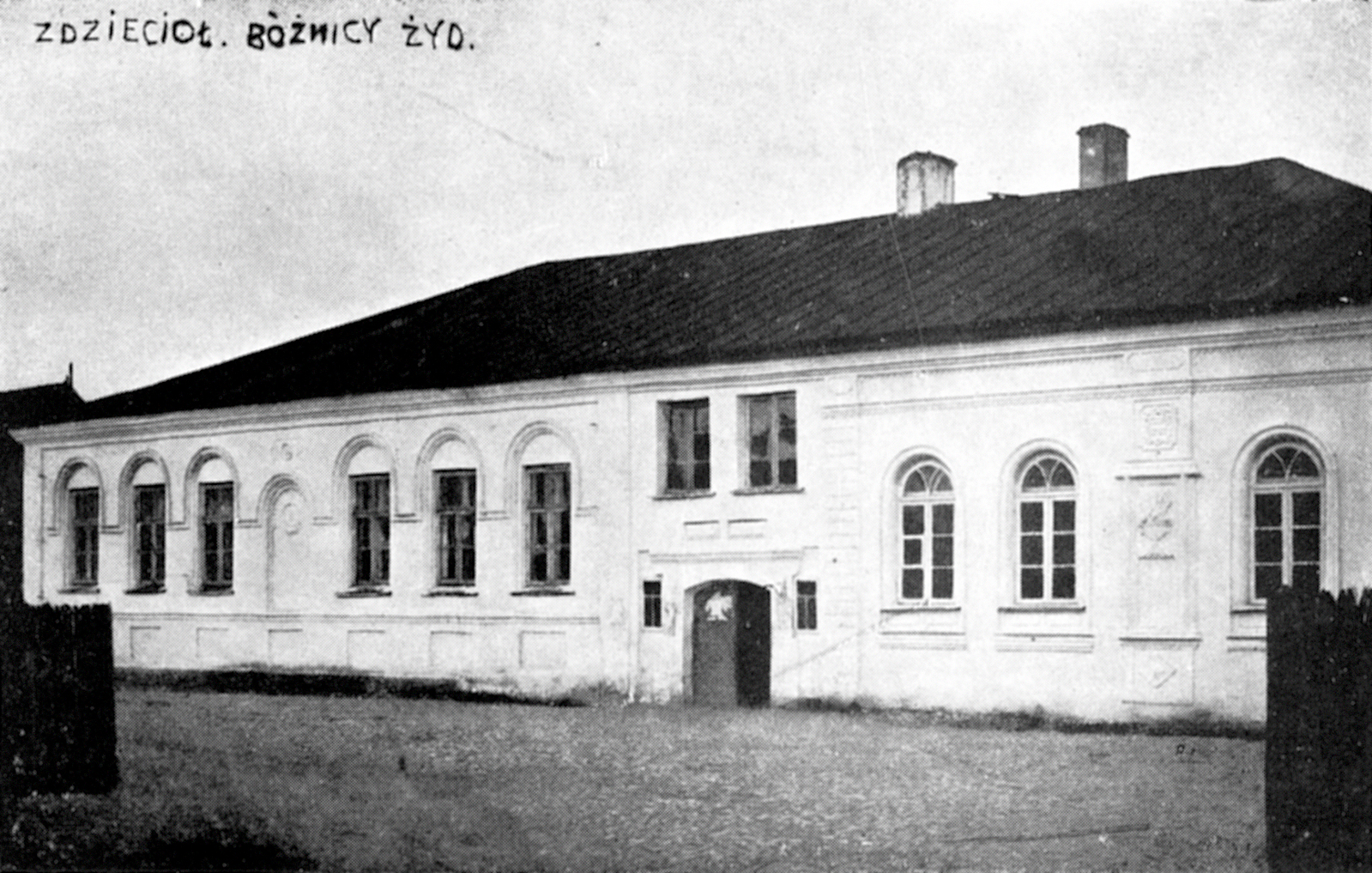
- The Synagogue of Dzyatlava (Zhetel) at the onset of World War II

- Location of Dzyatlava (Zdzięcioł) during the Holocaust in Eastern Europe
- Location: Dzyatlava, Western Belarus, German-occupied Poland
- Incident type: Imprisonment, slave labor, starvation, mass killings
- Organizations: SS, Einsatzgruppe C, Belarusian Auxiliary Police, Wehrmacht
- Executions: Kurpyash Forest
- Victims: Over 4,500 Jews.

The Dzyatlava Ghetto, Zdzięcioł Ghetto, or Zhetel Ghetto (in Yiddish) was a Nazi ghetto in the town of German-occupied Poland (Zdzięcioł) Dzyatlava, Western Belarus during World War II. After several months of Nazi ad-hoc persecution that began after the launch of Operation Barbarossa, the invasion of the Soviet Union, the new German authorities officially created a ghetto for all local Jews on 22 February 1942. Prior to 1939, the town (Zdzięcioł) was part of Nowogródek Voivodeship of the Second Polish Republic.

Some Jews formed a resistance and underground police force, but their efforts were discovered by the Germans. Most of those involved fled to the forest outside the ghetto, while at least one leader was executed.

The majority of the residents were murdered in two separate instances of mass killing in April and August of 1942. Their bodies were disposed of in mass graves dug by the Nazis. A few hundred skilled workers were transferred to another ghetto. After the first round of killings, survivors prepared hiding places in case of another massacre. Due to their efforts, several hundred residents were able to escape the final liquidation of the ghetto and form a camp in the forest until the end of the Nazi regime. Out of the 4,500 Jews who were made to live in the ghetto, between 3,200-4,200 were killed in these massacres.

== Town's Jewish history ==
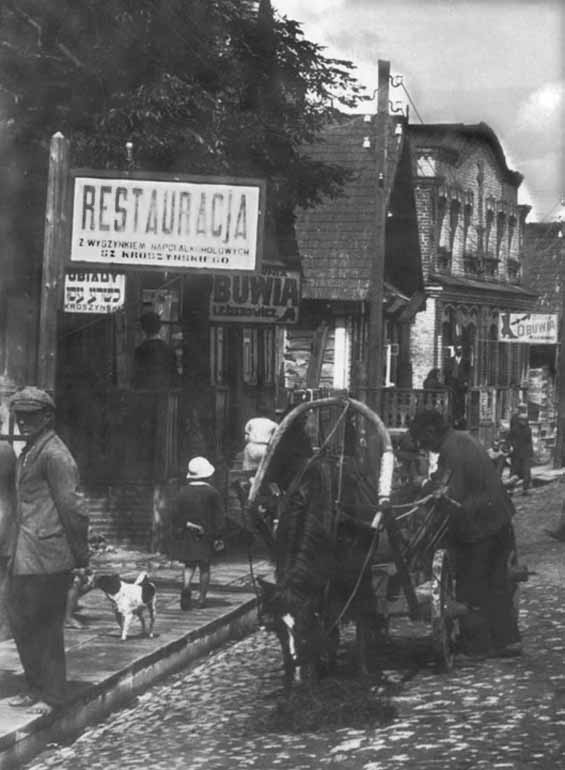
The Jewish Street (Ulica Żydowska) before World War II. Horse carriage in front of a restaurant (Restauracja in Polish).

The first Jews settled in Zdzięcioł in 1580. The town was the birthplace of preachers Jacob of Dubno and Yisrael Meir Kagan. In 1897, three-quarters of the city's total population of 3,979 were Jewish. In 1926, in the reborn Polish Republic, there were 3,450 Jews out of 4,600 people in Zdzięcioł (also 75 percent). During the Nazi-Soviet invasion of Poland Zdzięcioł was taken over by the Red Army and renamed Dzyatlava. In 1939–1941 many Jewish refugees arrived in the town from western and central Poland which was attacked by Germany in the beginning of World War II.

Soviet tanks rolled into Zdzięcioł in the evening of 18 September 1939. Police station was already abandoned. Next morning, Mayor Henryk Poszwiński was arrested by the NKVD along with school principals, sołectwo council, gmina clerks and a local priest, and taken to prison in Nowogródek never to be heard from again. In June 1941, Nazi Germany invaded the Soviet Union in Operation Barbarossa. The Jewish population of Zdzięcioł (Dziatłava) had increased to more than 4,500 due to influx of refugees.

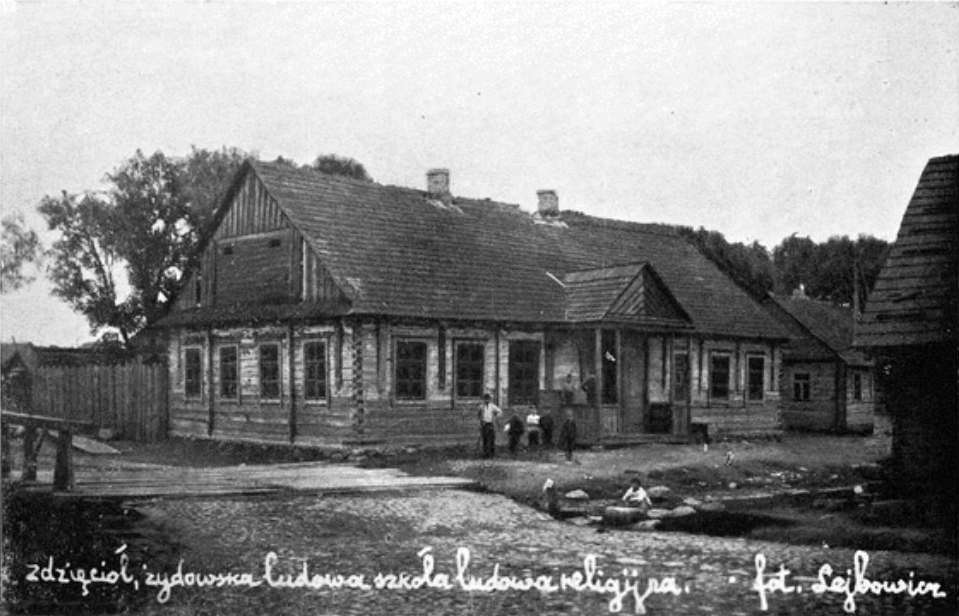
First Jewish public school in Zdzięcioł founded in the Second Polish Republic during the Interbellum

German forces occupied the town on 30 June 1941. On 14 July 1941, the German military commandant ordered that the Jews must wear the yellow badge on the front and back of their clothing under the threat of death. On 23 July, about 120 of the most respected citizens and members of the Jewish intelligentsia were selected from among the Jews and assembled in the square. The selection was carried out according to a list compiled by the collaborationist Belarusian Auxiliary Police (established on 7 July 1941) for the use by the SS Einsatzkommando killing squad arriving in Zdzięcioł. Among those arrested were Alter Dvoretsky (an attorney active in the Communist Poale Zion), the rabbi, and Jankel Kaplan. The local Jews bribed the Germans to attain the release of Dvoretsky and the rabbi. All the others were allegedly taken away for forced labor, but two days later it was discovered that they had been transported to the forest near the military barracks in Nowogródek and murdered there.

=== German occupation (1941–1942) ===
At the end of August 1941, Zdzięcioł was transferred to German civil administration and became part of the Nowogródek district (Gebietskommissariat). At this time the Judenrat Council was formed. Among its members were Alter Dvoretsky, Hirshl Benyamovitz, Jehuda Luski, Moshe Mendel Leizerovitz, Eli Novolenski, Dovid Senderovski, Faivel Epstein, Shaul Kaplinski, Rabbi Jitzhok Reicer and Berl Rabinovitz. Shmuel Kustin became the chairman of the Judenrat and Dvoretsky was the deputy chairman. Soon afterwards Dvoretsky replaced Kustin as head of the Judenrat. He was 37 and had obtained his education as a lawyer in Berlin and Warsaw.

One of the main tasks of the Judenrat was to ensure that the German orders were strictly carried out. On the second day of the holiday of Sukkot, some Germans arrived in the town to requisition horses for the army. Many of the Jews had decided to hide, but the Germans caught one – Ya'akov Noa – and shot him without warning. On 28 November 1941 the Jews of Zdzięcioł were made to line up, and forced to surrender all their valuables. Libe Gercowski, accused of having hidden two gold rings, was shot in front of everyone. On that day the Judenrat was also obliged to select four glaziers and fifteen carpenters who were sent to an unknown destination. On 15 December 1941 some 400 men were sent to the labor camp in Dworzec to work on the construction of an aerodrome. This work was supervised by the Nazi Organisation Todt.

=== Formation of the Ghetto ===
On 22 February 1942 the authorities put up posters on the walls announcing that all Jews had to move into the new ghetto, which was set up around the synagogue and the Talmud Torah building within the streets of Łysogórska and Słonimska. Over 4,500 Jews were ordered to relocate there. Between five and six families were forced to share houses vacated by non-Jews and many families had to split up. Eight or more people were put into each room, from which the furniture had been removed to be replaced by improvised bunk beds. Some of the families, like the Kaplans, prepared secret hiding places in the Ghetto, which helped them survive the later massacre.

The ghetto was partly fenced by wood and barbed wire, and two local policemen guarded the gate. The Jews were not permitted to talk to other citizens and warned that they might be shot if they attempted to obtain food from the outside. Nevertheless, peasants still brought food to the ghetto and sold it for gold, clothes, and other necessities. Special work permits were issued to those who performed forced labor outside the ghetto. The Jews were guarded when marched out of the ghetto in columns.

== Resistance in Zhetel ==
In autumn 1941, before the ghetto was set up, Alter Dvoretsky formed a Jewish underground organization in the town, consisting of about sixty people. Dvoretsky established links with the Jews living in the surrounding villages and also with a group of Red Army operatives, who were in the process of organizing Soviet partisan force in the area. His group was divided into twenty cells, each consisting of three men. They also obtained some weapons a month before the ghetto was established. About ten members of the underground joined the Jewish police.

Upon moving into the ghetto the underground group headed by Dvoretsky had the following aims: first, to prepare an armed revolt in the event that the ghetto was going to be liquidated; second, to collect money to buy weapons and bring them into the ghetto; and third, to convince the non-Jewish population not to cooperate with the Germans. The group made contact with the leader of the Soviet partisans in the area, Nikolai Vakhonin. On 20 April 1942 Dvoretsky and six members of the ghetto underground were forced to escape to the forest after their organization became known to the Germans. Shortly afterwards Dvoretsky was killed in an ambush. A number of other Jews were hiding in the dense Lipiczansky forest (Las Lipiczański) after fleeing from Zdzięcioł as well as from Żołudek (Zheludok in Russian), Belica (Belitsa), Kozlowszczyna, Dworzec and Nowogródek. Their leaders were Pinya Green and Hirshel Kaplinski.

=== Partisan resistance activities ===
After a while a partisan detachment consisting of more than one hundred Jews was formed in the forest near Zdzięcioł. It was called the "Zhetler Battalion." Everybody who wanted to join in had first to obtain a gun. The unit was divided into three platoons headed by Hershl Kaplinsky (Israel Kaplinski), Jonah Midvetsky, and Shalom Ogulnik respectively. The staff of the headquarters included two other members, Pinya Green and Shalom Gerling. There were also some women in the battalion, acting as nurses, cooks, secretaries, typists and washerwomen. A few of them also took part in combat activities.

The unit's base was some twenty kilometers away from Zdzięcioł in the Lipiczański (Lipichanski) forest. They accepted Jews from around Nowogródek, and coordinated all their activities with the Soviet partisans operating in the area, in particular with the Orlanski ("Borba") detachment under Nikolai Vakhonin, as well as, with the Lenin Brigade. The Lenin Brigade was subordinate to the Baranowicze Branch of the General Staff of the Soviet Partisan Movement of Belorussia under Soviet Major General Vasilii Chernyshev (Chernyshov), known as "Platon". "Platon" commanded more Soviet units locally including the Kirov Brigade under Sinichkin (and later, Vassiliev), who in turn gave orders to Bielski partisans. Tuvia Bielski said later about the Polish farmers: "Without them, we would not have survived the early times." The Soviets attacked the railroad tracks on the Lida-Baranowicze, Baranowicze-Minsk and Wolkowysk-Bialystok lines. Yisrael Bousel invented a new sort of improvised mine, which the Soviet partisans successfully used to derail German trains. He was posthumously awarded the honorary title of "Hero of the Soviet Union."

== Liquidation of Zhetel Ghetto ==
On 29 April 1942 the Germans arrested the Judenrat. At dawn on 30 April the ghetto inmates were woken by shots inside the ghetto. The Germans announced through the Judenrat that all the Jews were to go to the old cemetery, which was situated within the ghetto boundaries. At the same time the Germans and their collaborators began to drive the Jews out of their houses, beating, kicking, and shooting those who were reluctant to obey. A selection was then carried out: women, children, and the old were sent to the left, the young skilled workers to the right.

About 1,200 of those sent to the right were marched along the streets to the Kurpiasz (Kurpyash) Forest on the southern edge of town, where some pits had been dug out in advance. There the Germans shot them in groups of twenty. During the course of the shooting the German district commissar appeared and released those who had a certificate stating their profession as well as their families. Thus about one hundred returned to the ghetto. The massacre was conducted by the German and local Belarusian Auxiliary Police forces.

The second massacre started on 6 August 1942 and lasted for three days. Many Jews hid in prepared dug-outs. During the course of the final liquidation of the ghetto some 2,000–3,000 Jews were executed and buried in three mass graves in the Jewish cemetery on the southern outskirts of Zdzięcioł, roughly 1,000 people in each. Just over 200 Jewish craftsmen were transferred to the Nowogródek ghetto. This was the end of the ghetto and the end of the Jewish community of Zdzieciol. Several hundred Jews including the Kaplan family, who had hidden, fled once the massacre was over, some forming a family camp in the Nakryshki forest, where they managed to survive until the liberation. Among the known victims of the 1942 massacre were the members of Tinkovitzki family including Riva Tinkovitzkaya (Tinkowicka?, born in 1909), Zelik Tinkovitzkaya (born in 1912) and Estera Tinkovitzkaya (born in 1871).

=== Aftermath ===
Word spread about the "Zhetel partisan detachment" among Jews in the labor camps of Dworzec and Nowogródek. A number of Jews escaped and tried to join them. Many of these were then caught on the way to the forest and handed over to the Germans by the locals. The "Zhetler detachment" in turn exacted revenge on such collaboration. One act of revenge-killing took place in the village of Molery on 10 September 1942. After eliminating two collaborators, the Jewish partisans also informed the elder of the village and the local villagers about the precise reasons why they carried out this reprisal. Tuvia Bielski related a much larger number of bloody revenge killings of Belarusian families whose farms were later burned down. However, "the fact that there are hundreds of survivors would indicate – wrote Yehuda Bauer – that there were a fairly large number of people willing to engage in rescue" of Jews also. For example, a local Polish couple Jan and Józefa Jarmolowicz (Jarmolowitz), later awarded titles of Righteous among the Nations, hid five Jews for over a year on their farm.

== Timeline ==
- Pre-1939: Zdzięcioł (Yiddish: זשעטל, romanized: Zhetl)), town in the Nowogródek province, Second Polish Republic
- 1939-41: Dyatlovo, Belorussian SSR (following Elections to the People's Assemblies of Western Ukraine and Western Belarus)
- 1941-44: Djatlowo, Rayon center, Gebiet Nowogrodek, Generalbezirk Weissruthenien
- Post-1944: Dyatlovo, Grodno province, Belorussian SSR
- Since 1991: Republic of Belarus

== See also ==
- Słonim Ghetto in the territories of Poland annexed by the Soviet Union, holding 22,000–25,000 Polish Jews.
