= Opęchowo =

- Village
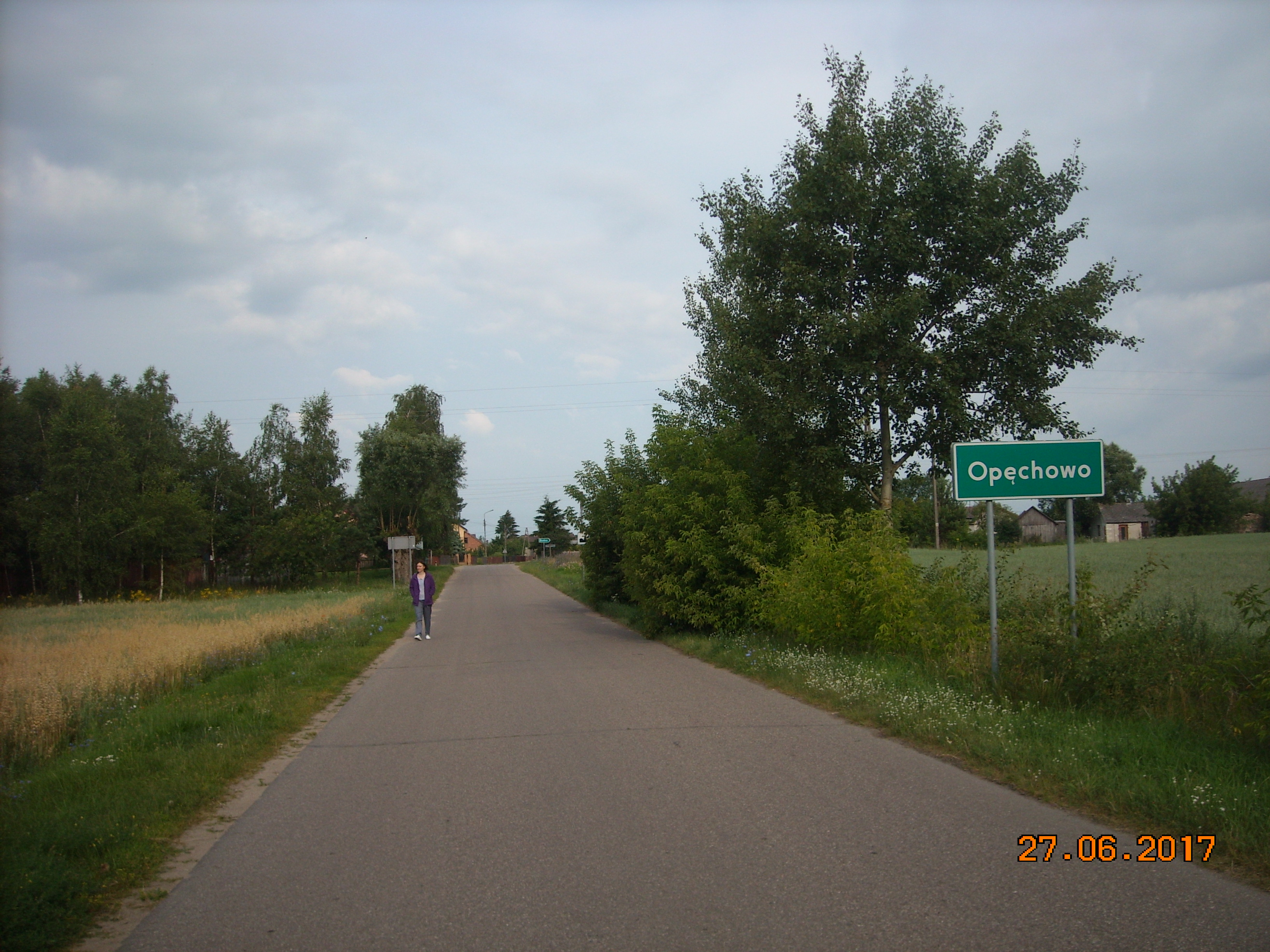

- Location within Poland
- Coordinates: 53°3′33″N 21°47′42″E
- Country: Poland
- Voivodeship: Masovian
- County: Ostrołęka
- Gmina: Troszyn
- Highest elevation: 150 m (490 ft)
- Lowest elevation: 100 m (330 ft)

Opęchowo [ɔpɛ̃ˈxɔvɔ] is a village in the administrative district of Gmina Troszyn, within Ostrołęka County, Masovian Voivodeship, in east-central Poland. The climate is cold and temperate with a great deal of rainfall – even in the driest month.
