= Navayelnya =

Urban-type settlement in Grodno Region, Belarus

Navayelnya Наваельня (Belarusian) Новоельня (Russian)
- Urban-type settlement
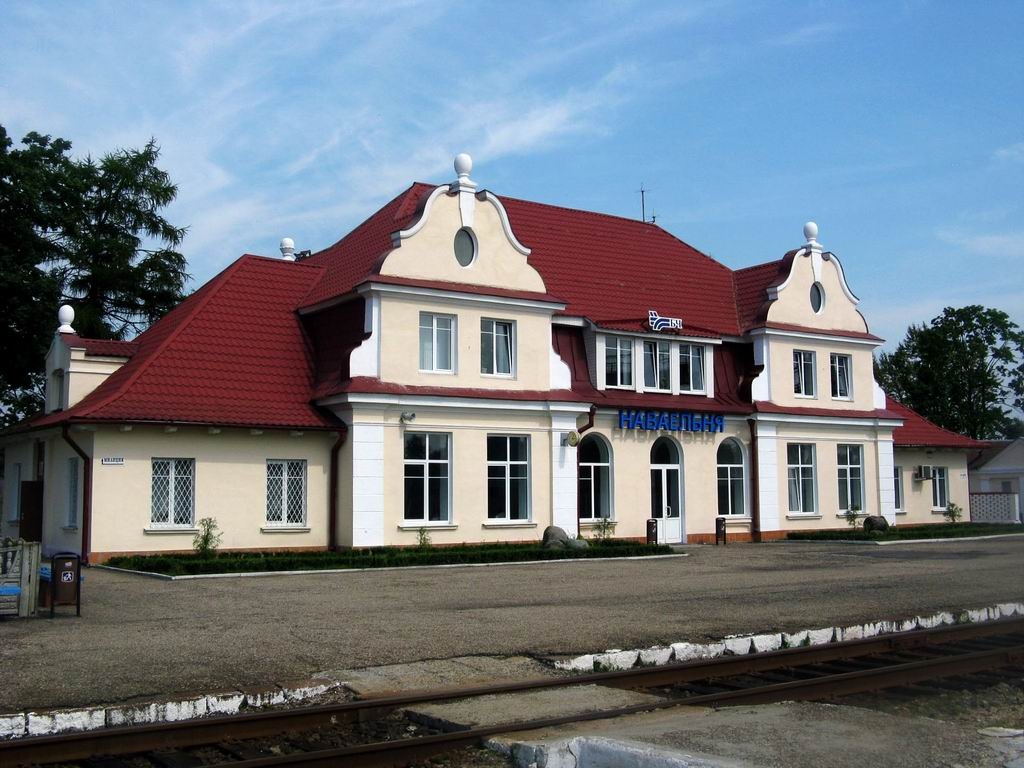

- Location within Belarus
- Coordinates: 53°27′42″N 25°35′22″E
- Country: Belarus
- Region: Grodno Region
- District: Dzyatlava District

Population (2025)
  - Total: 2,584
- Time zone: UTC+3 (MSK)

Navayelnya (Belarusian: Наваельня, romanized: Navajeĺnia; Russian: Новоельня, romanized: Novoyelnya) is an urban-type settlement in Dzyatlava District, Grodno Region, Belarus. As of 2025, it has a population of 2,584.

== History ==
It was first mentioned in the 16th century as the village of Yelnya in Novogrudok powiat of the Grand Duchy of Lithuania. In the 17th century, a manor was built here (not preserved). In 1733, Count Antoni Tyzenhauz, a political and public figure of the Grand Duchy of Lithuania, one of the most talented financiers of his time, was born here.

As a result of the Third Partition of Poland in 1795, Yelnya became part of the Russian Empire, in the Novogrudsky Uyezd. In 1842, the settlement received the status of a town. With the opening of traffic on the Vilno-Luninets railway section in 1884, a railway station was built there.

According to the Treaty of Riga (1921), Navayelnya became part of the interwar Polish Republic, where it became part of Slonim powiat of the Nowogródek Voivodeship.

In 1939, Navayelnya became part of the Byelorussian Soviet Socialist Republic. During the Great Patriotic War, from June 1941 to July 1944, it was under German occupation. A mass grave was discovered during the construction of a warehouse for a flax export base, and on June 25, 2005, a monument to the victims of the Jewish genocide was erected at this site.

In 1945, it received the status of an urban-type settlement and until 1954, it was the center of Dyatlovsky district. From 1962 to 1965, it was part of Novogrudok district.
