= Żmijówek-Mans =

- Village
- Location within Poland
- Coordinates: 52°59′51″N 21°48′37″E
- Country: Poland
- Voivodeship: Masovian
- County: Ostrołęka
- Gmina: Troszyn
- Highest elevation: 150 m (490 ft)
- Lowest elevation: 100 m (330 ft)

Żmijówek-Mans [ʐmiˈjuvɛk ˈmans] is a village in the administrative district of Gmina Troszyn, within Ostrołęka County, Masovian Voivodeship, in east-central Poland.
