= Rostki, Ostrołęka County =

Rostki
- Village
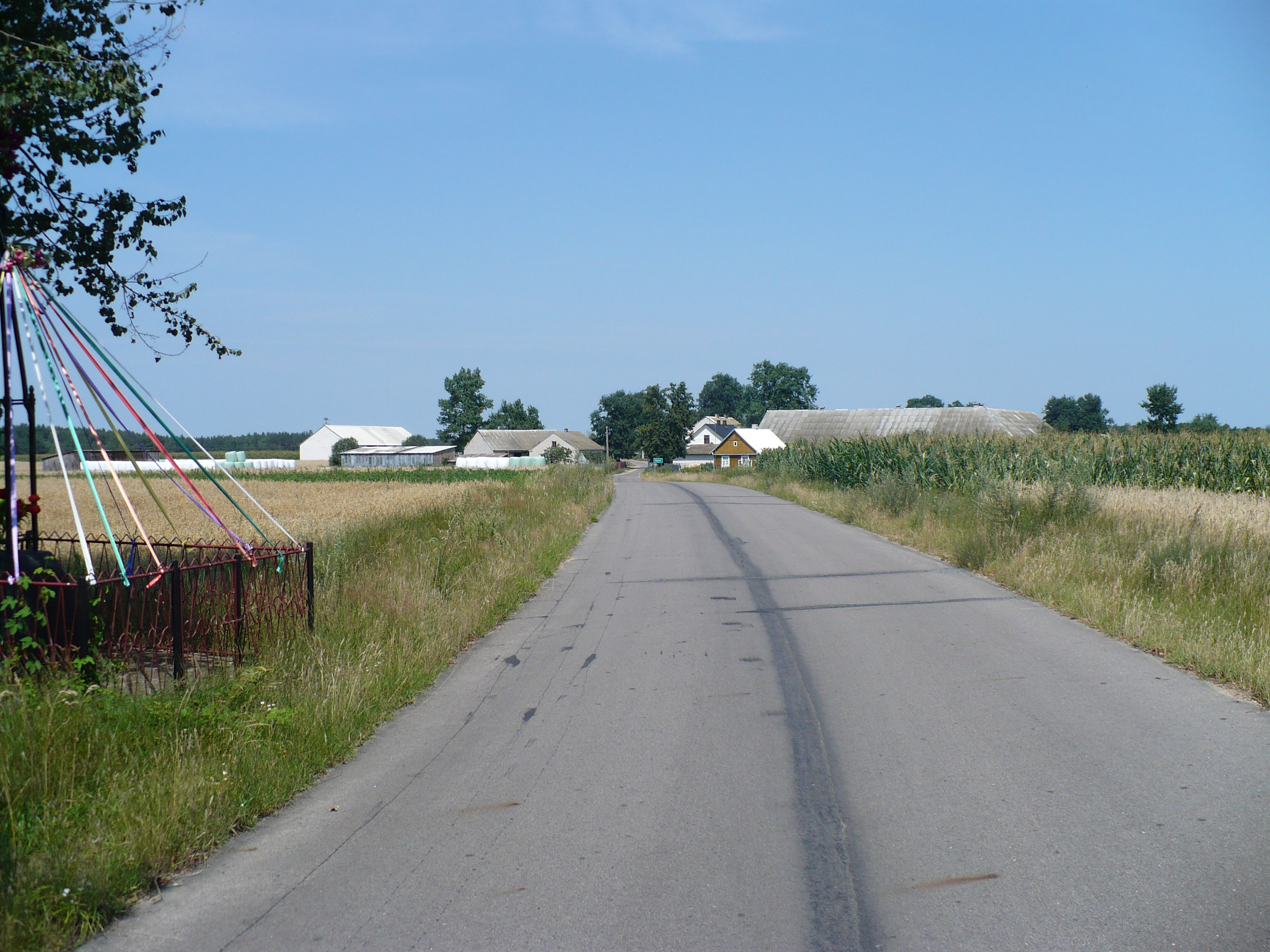
- View of Rostki from Stylągi

- Location within Poland
- Coordinates: 52°59′50″N 21°44′49″E
- Country: Poland
- Voivodeship: Masovian
- County: Ostrołęka
- Gmina: Troszyn
- Population: 60

Rostki [ˈrɔstki] is a village in the administrative district of Gmina Troszyn, within Ostrołęka County, Masovian Voivodeship, in east-central Poland.
