= Ojcewo =

- Village
- Location within Poland
- Coordinates: 53°2′39″N 21°48′26″E
- Country: Poland
- Voivodeship: Masovian
- County: Ostrołęka
- Gmina: Troszyn
- Highest elevation: 150 m (490 ft)
- Lowest elevation: 100 m (330 ft)

Ojcewo [ɔi̯ˈt͡sɛvɔ] is a village in the administrative district of Gmina Troszyn, within Ostrołęka County, Masovian Voivodeship, in east-central Poland.
