= Troszyn, Masovian Voivodeship =

Troszyn
- Village
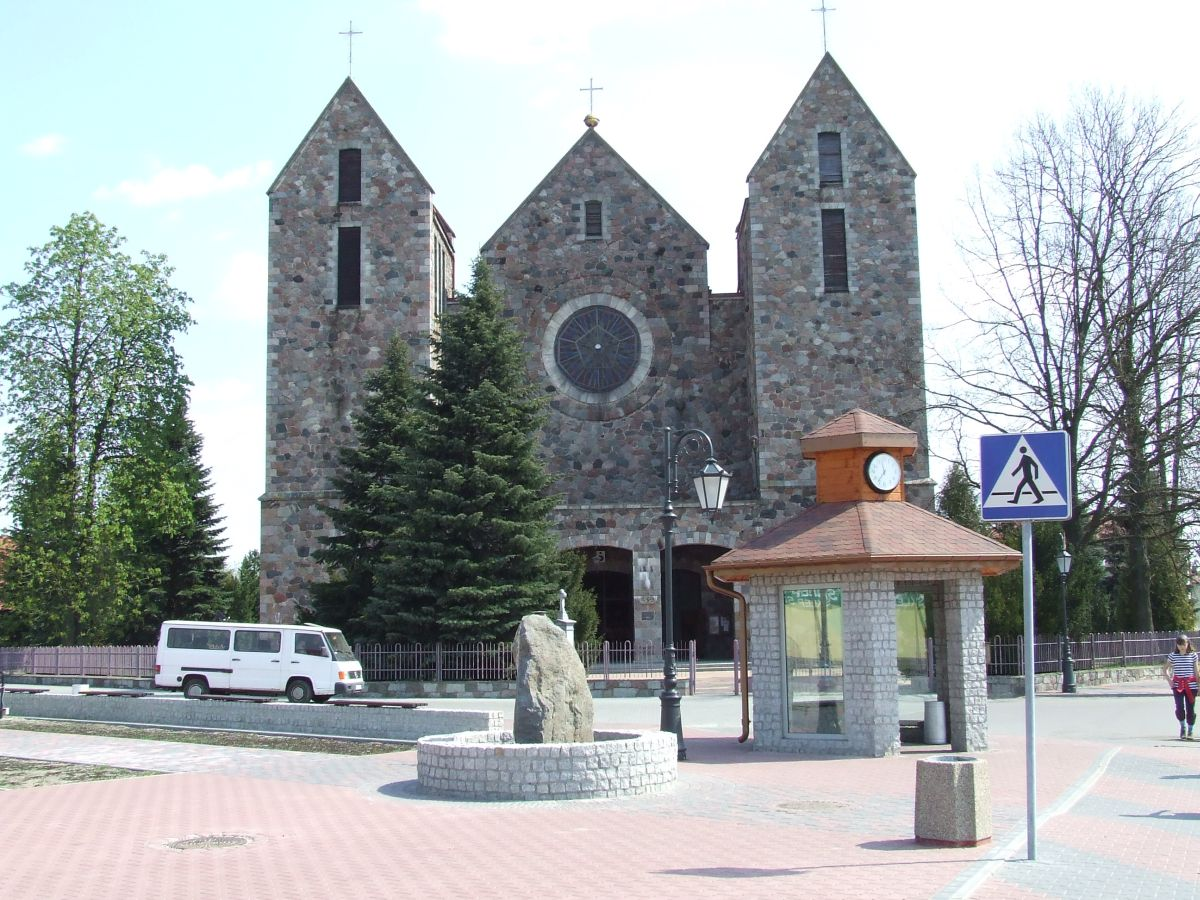
- Church of Saint Bartholomew

- Location within Poland
- Coordinates: 53°1′49″N 21°44′9″E
- Country: Poland
- Voivodeship: Masovian
- County: Ostrołęka
- Gmina: Troszyn
- Highest elevation: 150 m (490 ft)
- Lowest elevation: 100 m (330 ft)

Troszyn [ˈtrɔʂɨn] is a village in Ostrołęka County, Masovian Voivodeship, in east-central Poland. It is the seat of the gmina (administrative district) called Gmina Troszyn.
