= Łątczyn Włościański =

- Village
- Location within Poland
- Coordinates: 53°6′N 21°48′E
- Country: Poland
- Voivodeship: Masovian
- County: Ostrołęka
- Gmina: Troszyn

Łątczyn Włościański (Polish pronunciation: [ˈwɔnt.tʂɨn vwɔɕˈtɕaj̃skʲi]) is a village in the administrative district of Gmina Troszyn, within Ostrołęka County, Masovian Voivodeship, in east-central Poland.
