= Confracourt =

- Commune
- Coat of arms
- Location of Confracourt
- Location within France Location within Bourgogne-Franche-Comté
- Coordinates: 47°40′02″N 5°52′37″E
- Country: France
- Region: Bourgogne-Franche-Comté
- Department: Haute-Saône
- Arrondissement: Vesoul
- Canton: Jussey

Government
  - Mayor (2020–2026): Patrick Baud
- Area^{1}: 19.69 km^{2} (7.60 sq mi)
- Highest elevation: 337 m (1,106 ft)
- Lowest elevation: 217 m (712 ft)
- Population (2023): 201
  - Density: 10.2/km^{2} (26.4/sq mi)
- Time zone: UTC+01:00 (CET)
  - Summer (DST): UTC+02:00 (CEST)
- INSEE/Postal code: 70169 /70120
- ^{1} French Land Register data, which excludes lakes, ponds, glaciers > 1 km^{2} (0.386 sq mi or 247 acres) and river estuaries.

Confracourt (French pronunciation: [kɔ̃fʁakuʁ]) is a commune in the Haute-Saône department in the region of Bourgogne-Franche-Comté in eastern France.

== See also ==
- Communes of the Haute-Saône department
