= Dzyatlava district =

District of Grodno region, Belarus

Dzyatlava district Дзятлаўскі раён (Belarusian) Дятловский район (Russian)
- District
- Flag Coat of arms

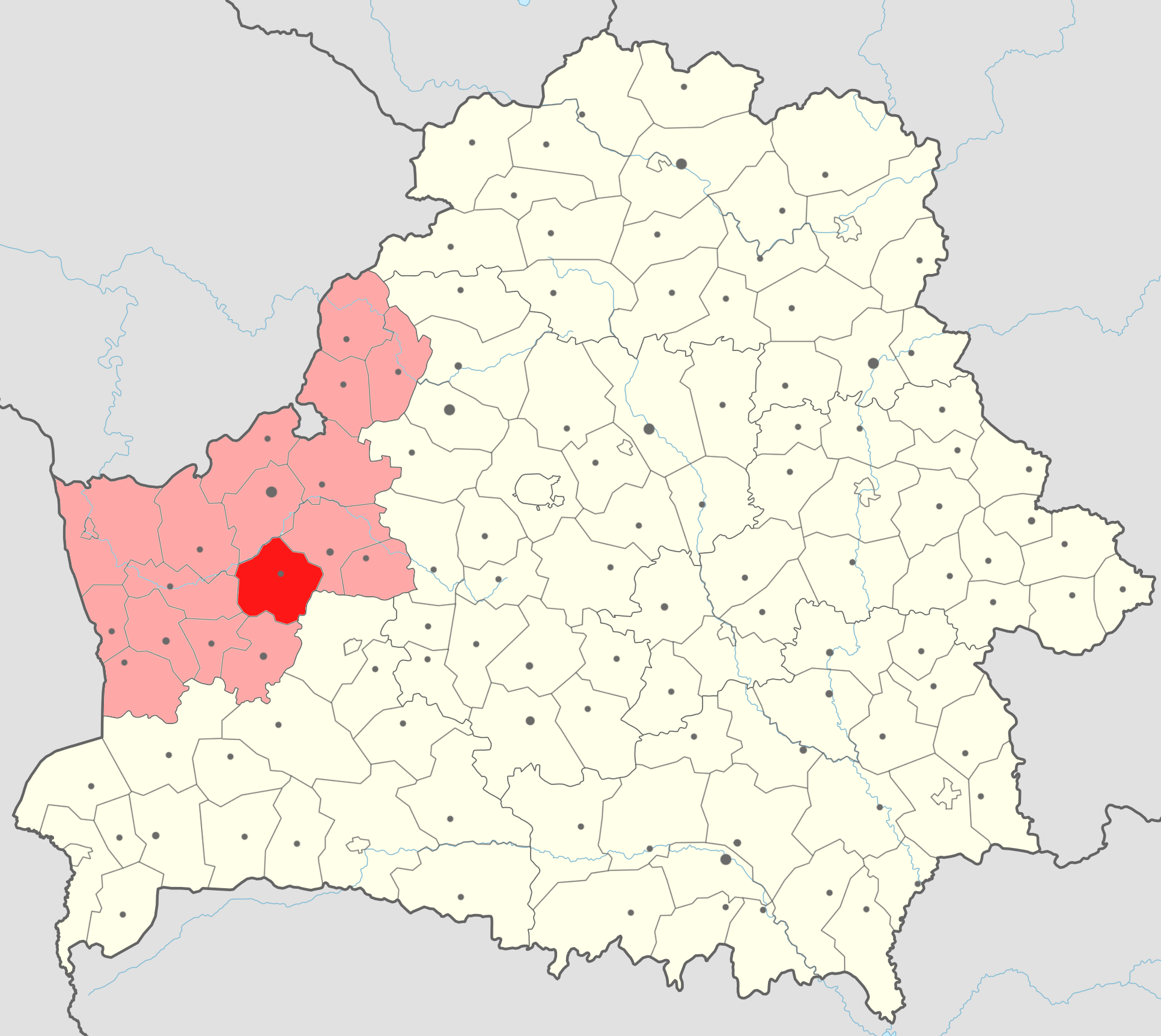
- Coordinates: 53°27′N 25°24′E
- Country: Belarus
- Region: Grodno region
- Administrative center: Dzyatlava

Area
  - District: 1,544.09 km^{2} (596.18 sq mi)

Population (2024)
  - District: 22,477
  - Density: 14.557/km^{2} (37.702/sq mi)
  - Urban: 11,838
  - Rural: 10,639
- Time zone: UTC+3 (MSK)

Dzyatlava district or Dziatlava district (Belarusian: Дзятлаўскі раён; Russian: Дятловский район) is a district (raion) of Grodno region in Belarus. The administrative center is Dzyatlava. As of 2024, it has a population of 22,477.

== Notable residents ==
- Viačasłaŭ Adamčyk (1933, Varakomščyna village – 2001), Belarusian journalist, writer, playwright and screenwriter
