= Hans Siegling =

German Waffen-SS officer

Hans Siegling (February 24, 1912 – December 25, 1997) was a German police officer and Obersturmbannführer in the Waffen-SS during World War II.

== Life during World War II ==
Siegling joined the Nazi Party and the Sturmabteilung in 1930. In 1932 he began his service with the security police. Eventually, he resigned from the party and the SA in the same year, only to rejoin on May 1, 1933 after Adolf Hitler's rise to power. In May 1941, he applied for membership in the SS, and was eventually accepted on November 25, 1941 and was given the rank of Hauptsturmführer. In 1944, he was promoted to SS-Sturmbannführer and on August 14, 1944 to SS-Obersturmbannführer and to lieutenant colonel of the police. In 1944, he was appointed commander of the 30th Waffen Grenadier Division of the SS.

== Post-war activities ==
After World War II, he became an entrepreneur in Bavaria.
