= Belarusian Auxiliary Police =

Collaborationist Belarusian police force set up by the Nazi occupiers

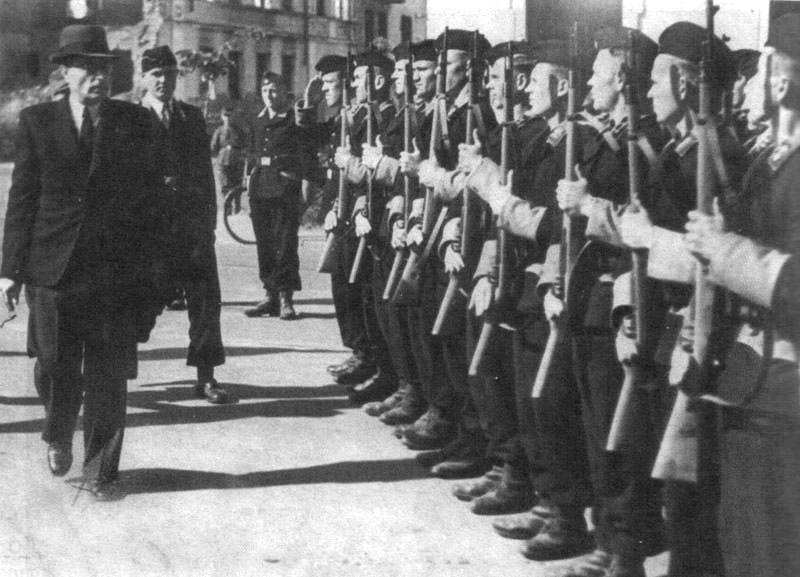
- Inspection of Belarusian Auxiliary Police by Radasłaŭ Astroŭski
- Active: July 1941-1944
- Country: Reichskommissariat Ostland
- Allegiance: Germany
- Type: Auxiliary police
- Role: Nazi security warfare The Holocaust in Belarus
- Size: 30,000 (1943)

The Belarusian Auxiliary Police (Belarusian: Беларуская дапаможная паліцыя, romanized: Biełaruskaja dapamožnaja palicyja; German: Weißruthenische Hilfspolizei) was a German force established in July 1941 in occupied Belarus, staffed by local collaborators. In western Belarus, auxiliary police were created in the form of Schutzmannschaften units, while in the east they were made as the Ordnungsdienst.

It was intended that the auxiliary police would consist of one policeman for every 100 villagers and one policeman for every 300 city residents.

== Creation ==
On 7 July 1941, the commander of Army Group Centre, General Max von Schenckendorf, in the occupied territory of Belarus, issued an order to create a local administration and order service called Miliz or Order Service (German: Ordnungsdienst; OD). After the passage of the front and the stabilization of the civil administration in western Belarus in the form of Generalbezirk Weissruthenien, the OD units passed from under the authority of the German army to the Order Police (Orpo) and were transformed on 6 November 1941, into permanent Guarding Troops (German: Schutzmannschaft, Schuma) subordinated to the commander of Orpo in Belarus. In eastern Belarus, which was still the area of operations of Army Group Centre, the OD continued to operate. The division between Schuma in western Belarus and OD in eastern Belarus persisted until the end of the German occupation.

== Ordnungsdienst ==
The Ordnungsdienst, which operated in the eastern part of the country, was divided into four branches: criminal police (OD I), state police (OD II; prosecuting anti-German activity), order police (OD III) and combat police (OD IV), dealing with enemy "bands". OD I and OD II were under authority of the Security Police and the SD, the other two branches were still fully under the military authorities.

The number of police officers stationed at local posts was relatively small, assumed to be no more than 300 for each district and city, with 500 expected in larger cities. The threat from partisan units led to the rapid expansion of local forces and the formation of peasant militias in the form of Hilfs-OD units and village police.

== Schutzmannschaften ==
The Schutzmannschaften was a formation whose main task, in addition to guarding order, was to combat hostile activity. For this reason, in addition to the normal police force, there were trained battalions of a military nature. Schutzmannschaften were categorized into:

- Schutzmannschaften-Einzeldienst – a regular police force of an orderly nature, stationed in posts in cities and provinces
- Hilfsschutzmannschaften – force designed to guard prisoner of war camps and carry out ad hoc tasks
- Feuerschutzmannschaften – firefighting force
- Schuma battalions of three kinds:
  - Feld-Bataillone – field battalions
  - Wacht-Bataillone – guard battalions
  - Ersatz-Bataillone – reserve battalions

The exact number of Belarusian Schuma battalions is uncertain, the most accepted estimation is 7 guard battalions, 4 field and 1 reserve battalions:

- 45 Schutzmannschaft Bataillon, formed in September 1943;
- 46 Schutzmannschaft Bataillon, formed in July 1942 in Minsk;
- 47 Schutzmannschaft Bataillon, formed in July 1942 in Minsk;
- 48 Schutzmannschaft Ersatz-Bataillon, formed in July 1942 in Minsk;
- 48 Schutzmannschaft Feld-Bataillon 48, formed in August 1943 in Slonim;
- 49 Weiss-Schutzmannschafts Wacht-Bataillon, formed in September 1942 in Minsk;
- 60 Weiss Schuma-Feld-Bataillon, formed in August 1943 in Snoŭ;
- 64 Weiss Schuma-Feld-Bataillon, formed in February 1944 in Hlybokaye;
- 65 Weiss Schuma-Wacht-Bataillon, formed in February 1944 in Novogrudok;
- 66 Weiss Schuma-Wacht-Bataillon, formed in February 1944 in Slutsk;
- 67 Weiss Schuma-Wacht-Bataillon, formed in February 1944 in Vileyka;
- 68 Weiss Schuma-Wacht-Bataillon, formed in February 1944 in Novogrudok;

The 36th Police Rifle Regiment, with about 1,100 soldiers, was also formed from some of the Schuma volunteers, with one battalion to be German and the other two Belarusian with German officers.

== Activities ==
Belarusian Auxiliary Police participated in civilian massacres across villages on the territory of modern-day Belarus; dubbed the anti-partisan actions. The role of the local policemen was crucial in the totality of procedures, as only they – wrote Martin Dean – knew the identity of the Jews.

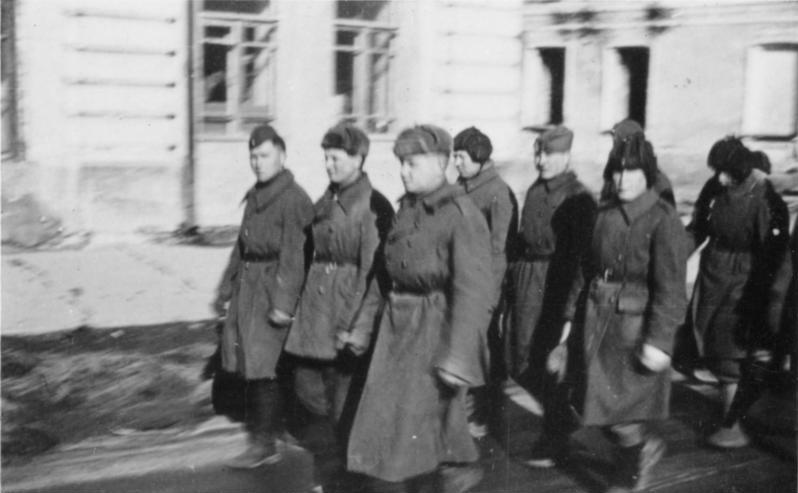
Belarusian Auxiliary Police in Mogilev, March 1943.

The German Order Police battalions as well as Einsatzgruppen carried out the first wave of killings. The pacification actions were conducted using experienced Belarusian auxiliary guards in roundups (as in Gomel, Mazyr, Kalinkavichy, Karma). The Belarusian police took on a secondary role in the first stage of the killings. The ghettoised Jews were controlled and brutalized before mass executions (as in Dobrush, Chachersk, Zhytkavichy).

After a while the auxiliary police, being locals, not only led the Jews out of the ghettos to places of massacres but also took active part in the shooting actions. Such tactic was successful (without much exertion of force) in places where the destruction of the Jews was carried out in early September, and throughout October and November 1941. In winter 1942, a different tactic was used – the killing raids in Zhlobin, Pyetrykaw, Streszyn, Chachersk. The role of the Belarusian police in the killings became particularly noticeable during the second wave of the ghetto liquidation actions, starting in February–March 1942.

During Operation Cottbus which began on 20 May 1943 in the areas of Begoml, Lyepyel and Ushachy, a number of Belarusian auxiliary police battalions took part in the mass murder of unarmed civilians (predominantly Jews), along with the SS Special Battalion Dirlewanger and other destruction units. They included the 46th Belarusian Battalion from Novogrodek, the 47th Belarusian Battalion from Minsk, the 51st Belarusian Battalion from Volozhin, and the 49th Belarusian Battalion also from Minsk.

== Legacy ==
Little is known about the specifics of the wartime atrocities committed by the Belarusian Auxiliary Police in the vast number of small Belarusian communities because the Belarusian police's involvement in the Holocaust is not acknowledged publicly in the country. Article 28 in the Constitution of the Republic of Belarus, under the "Procedures Governing Access to Documents Containing Information Relating to the Secret Life of Private Citizens" (added in July 1996), denies access to information about Belarusians who served with the Nazis. "The official memorial narrative allows only a pro-Soviet version of the resistance to the German invaders."

The 2008 historical drama film Defiance portrays the Belarusian Auxiliary Police during the initial stages of the film assisting the Einsatzgruppen perpetrating anti-Jewish massacres in occupied Belarus in August 1941. They finally appear in a firefight with the main characters.

== Bibliography ==
- Dean, Martin (2000). Collaboration in the Holocaust: Crimes of the Local Police in Belorussia and Ukraine, 1941–44. London: Palgrave Macmillan. ISBN 1403963711.
- Grzybowski, Jerzy (2021). Białoruski ruch niepodległościowy w czasie II wojny światowej [Belarusian independence movement during World War II] (in Polish). Warsaw. ISBN 978-83-8229-251-0.
- Rein, Leonid (2017). "The Belarusian Auxiliary Police". In Böhler, Jochen (ed.). The Waffen-SS. A European History.
