= Battle of Lasy Królewskie =

1939 battle of the Invasion of Poland

- Part of Invasion of Poland
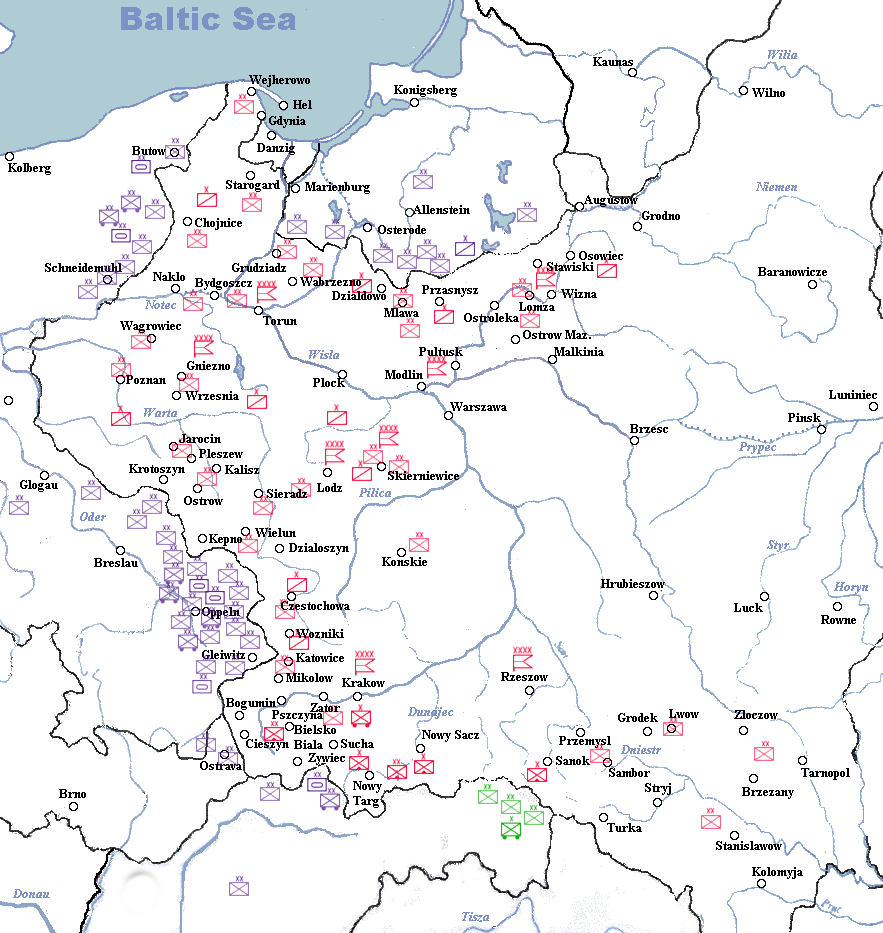
- Polish and German deployment on September 1st 1939.
Date	1 September 1939
Location	Janowo, Krzynowłoga Mała, Warsaw Voivodeship, Poland
Result	Inconclusive: Strategic Polish victory

Belligerents
Germany	Poland

Commanders and leaders
Colonel Kurt Feldt Lieutenant General Ludwig von Leyen	Colonel Jan Karcz Lieutenant Władysław Kossakowski

Strength
Cavalry component of the 3rd Army (Wehrmacht)	11th Cavalry "Legions'" Regiment of Mazowiecka Cavalry Brigade

Casualties and losses
17 killed 25 wounded	20 killed 11 wounded

Battle of Lasy Królewskie (Polish: Bitwa w Lasach Królewskich, Battle of Royal Forests) refers to the battle on 1 September 1939 near Janowo and Krzynowłoga Mała during the Battle of the Border of the Invasion of Poland.

The German Third Army attacked towards Warsaw from East Prussia, but became entangled by the Mlawa fortifications. Panzer Division Kempf and two divisions of the 1st Corps were stopped by the Polish 20th Infantry Division. The Wodrig Corps could not flank the Polish position due to the swampy ground. Along the Ulatkowka river, Polish Uhlan cavalry (elements of 11th Cavalry "Legions'" Regiment) stopped attacks by the German 1st Cavalry Brigade. Rather than a mounted fight, most were dismounted. However, the Poles did stall the German Third Army advance.

== See also ==
- List of World War II military equipment of Poland
- List of German military equipment of World War II
