= Battle of Mława =

One of the opening battles of the Invasion of Poland and World War II in general

Coordinates: 53°07′00″N 20°22′00″E

- Part of the Invasion of Poland
Date	1–10 September 1939
Location	Near Mława, Warsaw Voivodeship, Poland
Result	Poilsh victory

Belligerents
Germany	Poland

Commanders and leaders
(Nazi Germany) Georg von Küchler	(Second Polish Republic) Wilhelm Lawicz-Liszka (Second Polish Republic) Emil Krukowicz-Przedrzymirski

Units involved
(Nazi Germany) I Army Corps: Panzer Division Kempf; 61st Infantry Division; 11th Infantry Division; (Nazi Germany) "Wodrig" Army Corps: 1st Infantry Division; 12th Infantry Division; 1st Cavalry Brigade	(Second Polish Republic) Army Modlin: 20th Infantry Division; 8th Infantry Division; Nowogródzka Cavalry Brigade; Mazowiecka Cavalry Brigade

Casualties and losses
1,800 killed 3,000 wounded 1,000 missing 72 tanks destroyed	200 killed 500 wounded

The Battle of Mława, otherwise known as the Defence of the Mława position, took place to the north of the town of Mława in northern Poland between 1 and 3 September 1939. It was one of the opening battles of the Invasion of Poland and World War II in general. It was fought between the forces of the Polish Modlin Army under General Krukowicz-Przedrzymirski and the German 3rd Army under General Georg von Küchler.

== History ==
=== Eve of the Battle ===
As a result of the Treaty of Versailles, the new German-Polish border was located only some 120 km north of Warsaw, the Polish capital city. In 1939 the Polish Modlin Army, led by Brigadier General Emil Krukowicz-Przedrzymirski, was thought of as the main defensive force guarding Polish borders from the north. It was located along the border with East Prussia and was to stop the enemy forces advancing towards Warsaw, the Modlin Fortress. Shortly before the war, a decision was made to strengthen the Polish defences by construction of a line of field fortifications and concrete bunkers to the north of Mława, in the centre of the army's positions.

The main line of defence of the army was located along the line of Narew and Vistula rivers. There were a number of 19th-century fortifications in the area, but the plains to the north of it were almost defenseless. To ease the delaying actions in case of a war with Germany, the Polish General Staff decided that the Modlin Army should be transported to the border with East Prussia and should defend the line for as long as possible. Afterwards, the units under command of General Przedrzymirski-Krukowicz were to withdraw to the south and defend the line of Narew and Vistula rivers, together with the forces of Narew Independent Operational Group.

After the Polish secret mobilization had started in March 1939, the 20th Infantry Division was assigned to the Modlin Army and transported to the area of Mława. In addition, the army commander was assigned a number of trainloads of concrete and other construction materials and several combat engineering battalions. It was decided that a line of fortifications should be constructed in the area held by that division. On 19 June that year the project was ready and was finally approved by Marshal of Poland Edward Rydz-Śmigły on 3 July.

The line of trenches and concrete bunkers, shielded by anti-tank trenches and obstacles, was to be constructed along a low glacial hill overlooking the valley of the Mławka river, to the north of the town. The river itself could be blocked by a dam to enhance the defensive capability of the area. In the center, the swampy terrain of the Niemyje Marshes was located, which was virtually impassable to enemy armored vehicles. This swamp divided the area into two separate flanks. The western section was to be reinforced with 68 concrete bunkers while the eastern, much shorter, with 25.

In peacetime the 20th Division was located in Baranowicze. In case of a war with the USSR, it was planned as the first-line unit to defend a line of German World War I fortifications built there in 1915. Because of that, most of its soldiers had experience in defending fortified positions.

Polish bunker built by Narew Independent Operational Group

The construction of bunkers in the western section of the front, near the town of Mława, was started on 14 July. It was carried out mostly by the soldiers themselves, under the command of the head of the 20th engineering battalion, Maj. Juliusz Levittoux. The construction of the eastern flank bunkers near the village of Rzęgnowo started on 12 August. Soon the soldiers were joined by a number of civilian volunteers, helping to dig the trenches. However, the positions were not finished until the outbreak of World War II and many of the bunkers were not completed.

=== Battle ===
At noon on 1 September 1939 the Polish line of defence manned by the 20th Infantry Division was attacked by the 1st Army Corps under General Walter Petzel. Georg von Küchler, the commander of German Third Army, ordered his units to launch probing attacks across the Polish front. Troops of the 11th Infantry Division were repulsed by Polish 78th Infantry Regiment, while Waffen-SS troops of SS-Standarte Deutschland, part of Panzer Division Kempf, were halted by the Polish defenses at the village of Uniszki Zawadzkie and called for armored support. Panzer Regiment 7 arrived at 15:00 and mounted an assault. Although the attacking forces were equipped with tanks and supported by warplanes, the initial assault was repelled by Polish-made 37mm Armata ppanc. wz. 36 anti-tank guns after the advance of the German tanks was blocked by a 6 meter wide anti-tank ditch. Seven tanks belonging to Panzer Regiment 7 were destroyed in the action, and by 19:00 the German units fell back to their original positions. Only on the right flank of the Polish line did the Germans find any success, with the 12th Infantry Division and 1st Cavalry Brigade successfully dislodging the Mazowiecka Cavalry Brigade from their positions near the town of Chorzele. Late in the day, cavalry from both sides skirmished near the village of Krznowłoga Mała.

The following afternoon the German units started heavy artillery bombardment of the Polish positions, in coordination with an aerial attack by Ju 87 Stukas of Sturzkampfgeschwader 1. After two hours of artillery fire, the 11th and 61st Infantry Divisions launched an attack but were repulsed by the 80th and 78th Infantry Regiments respectively. At Rzęgnowo on the Polish right flank however, the 1st Infantry Division successesfully outflanked the Polish 79th Infantry Regiment, and the Polish troops retreated towards Mława around 16:00. Sensing weakness on the Polish right flank, von Küchler ordered Panzer Division Kempf moved towards Rzęgnowo to prepare for an assault the following day. Krukowicz-Przedrzymirski meanwhile ordered the 20th Division to extend further eastwards and prepare the defence of its right flank between the villages of Dębsk and Nosarzewo. At the same time the 8th Infantry Division, until then held in reserve near Ciechanów, was ordered to prepare a counterattack.

The 8th Division arrived in the area in the early hours of 3 September. As the Mazowiecka Cavalry Brigade operating further eastwards was also endangered by German armoured troops, the army commander ordered the division to split its forces and attack in two directions: towards Grudusk east of Mława and towards Przasnysz. However, conflicting orders and German saboteurs operating in the rear disrupted both attacks and led to chaos in the Polish ranks. Communication broke down and friendly fire incidents occurred between the 13th and 32nd Infantry Regiments during the night, resulting in the retreat of the latter. By 22:00 the division was mostly destroyed and only the 21st Infantry Regiment of Colonel (later General) Stanisław Sosabowski managed to withdraw from the fights towards the Modlin Fortress. Despite this, the German attacks towards both flanks of the 20th Infantry Division were unsuccessful.

On 3 September the German engineers finally managed to cut through Polish antitank barriers. The Germans used the local civilians as human shields, which allowed them to finally capture several bunkers on the left flank of the Polish forces, but were unable to push forwards. On the right flank, in the Rzegnów section of the front to the east of the swamps, the attacks were more successful and in the late evening elements of German Wodrig Corps finally broke through the lines of the 79th Infantry Regiment to the rear of the Poles. This widened the front gap in the area of Grudusk.

At 09:00 on September 4, General Emil Krukowicz-Przedrzymirski, facing the risk of his forces being outflanked and surrounded, ordered the 20th division and the remnants of the 8th to withdraw towards Warsaw and Modlin, finally abandoning the fortified positions.

=== Aftermath ===
The withdrawal was started in the early morning of 4 September. Although the German mechanized units suffered heavy losses and were unable to maintain pursuit, the area to the south of Mława was very lightly forested and the Polish forces were constantly bombarded and strafed by the German Luftwaffe, suffering heavy losses both in troops and equipment.

Although the position was abandoned, the German forces suffered substantial losses and it was not until 13 September that they finally managed to reach the Modlin Fortress, located less than 100 kilometres to the south.

== Opposing forces ==
=== Poland ===
Polish Army	Army	Division	Unit	Remarks
Edward Rydz-Śmigły HQ in Warsaw	Modlin Army; Krukowicz-Przedrzymirski	20th Infantry Division; Lawicz-Liszka	78th Słuck Infantry Regiment; Dudziński	NE of Mława
Edward Rydz-Śmigły HQ in Warsaw	Modlin Army; Krukowicz-Przedrzymirski	20th Infantry Division; Lawicz-Liszka	79th Lew Sapieha Regiment of Słonim Rifles; Zaborowski	Rzegnowo position
Edward Rydz-Śmigły HQ in Warsaw	Modlin Army; Krukowicz-Przedrzymirski	20th Infantry Division; Lawicz-Liszka	80th Nowogródek Rifles Infantry Regiment; Fedorczyk	N of Mława
Edward Rydz-Śmigły HQ in Warsaw	Modlin Army; Krukowicz-Przedrzymirski	8th Infantry Division; Wyrwa-Furgalski	13th Infantry Regiment	in reserve
Edward Rydz-Śmigły HQ in Warsaw	Modlin Army; Krukowicz-Przedrzymirski	8th Infantry Division; Wyrwa-Furgalski	21st Warsaw Infantry Regiment; Sosabowski	in reserve
Edward Rydz-Śmigły HQ in Warsaw	Modlin Army; Krukowicz-Przedrzymirski	8th Infantry Division; Wyrwa-Furgalski	32nd Infantry Regiment	in reserve

=== Germany ===
Wehrmacht	Army	Division	Unit	Remarks
3rd Army Georg von Küchler	I Corps; Petzel	Kempf Panzer Division; Kempf	7th Panzer Regiment
3rd Army Georg von Küchler	I Corps; Petzel	Kempf Panzer Division; Kempf	Motorized Infantry Regiment Großdeutschland
3rd Army Georg von Küchler	I Corps; Petzel	11th Infantry Division; Bock	2nd Infantry Regiment
3rd Army Georg von Küchler	I Corps; Petzel	11th Infantry Division; Bock	23rd Infantry Regiment
3rd Army Georg von Küchler	I Corps; Petzel	11th Infantry Division; Bock	44th Infantry Regiment
3rd Army Georg von Küchler	I Corps; Petzel	61st Infantry Division; Hänicke	151st Infantry Regiment
3rd Army Georg von Küchler	I Corps; Petzel	61st Infantry Division; Hänicke	162nd Infantry Regiment
3rd Army Georg von Küchler	I Corps; Petzel	61st Infantry Division; Hänicke	176th Infantry Regiment
3rd Army Georg von Küchler	Wodrig Corps; Wodrig	1st Infantry Division von Kortzfleisch	1st Infantry Regiment
3rd Army Georg von Küchler	Wodrig Corps; Wodrig	1st Infantry Division von Kortzfleisch	22nd Infantry Regiment
3rd Army Georg von Küchler	Wodrig Corps; Wodrig	1st Infantry Division von Kortzfleisch	43rd Infantry Regiment
3rd Army Georg von Küchler	Wodrig Corps; Wodrig	12th Infantry Division von der Leyen	27th Infantry Regiment
3rd Army Georg von Küchler	Wodrig Corps; Wodrig	12th Infantry Division von der Leyen	48th Infantry Regiment
3rd Army Georg von Küchler	Wodrig Corps; Wodrig	12th Infantry Division von der Leyen	89th Infantry Regiment
3rd Army Georg von Küchler	3rd Army Reserves; Wodrig	217th Infantry Division; Baltzer	311th Infantry Regiment
3rd Army Georg von Küchler	3rd Army Reserves; Wodrig	217th Infantry Division; Baltzer	346th Infantry Regiment
3rd Army Georg von Küchler	3rd Army Reserves; Wodrig	217th Infantry Division; Baltzer	389th Infantry Regiment

== See also ==
- List of World War II military equipment of Poland
- List of German military equipment of World War II

== Sources ==
- Wojciech Zalewski; Andrzej Aksamitowski (1996). Mława 1939 (in Polish). Warsaw: Altair. ISBN 83-86217-31-6.
- "Pozycja Mława". Fortyfikacje polskie II Rzeczypospolitej (1918–1939) (in Polish). Archived from the original on 2005-04-02.
