= Battle of the Border =

Series of battles between Nazi Germany and Poland

- Part of the Invasion of Poland
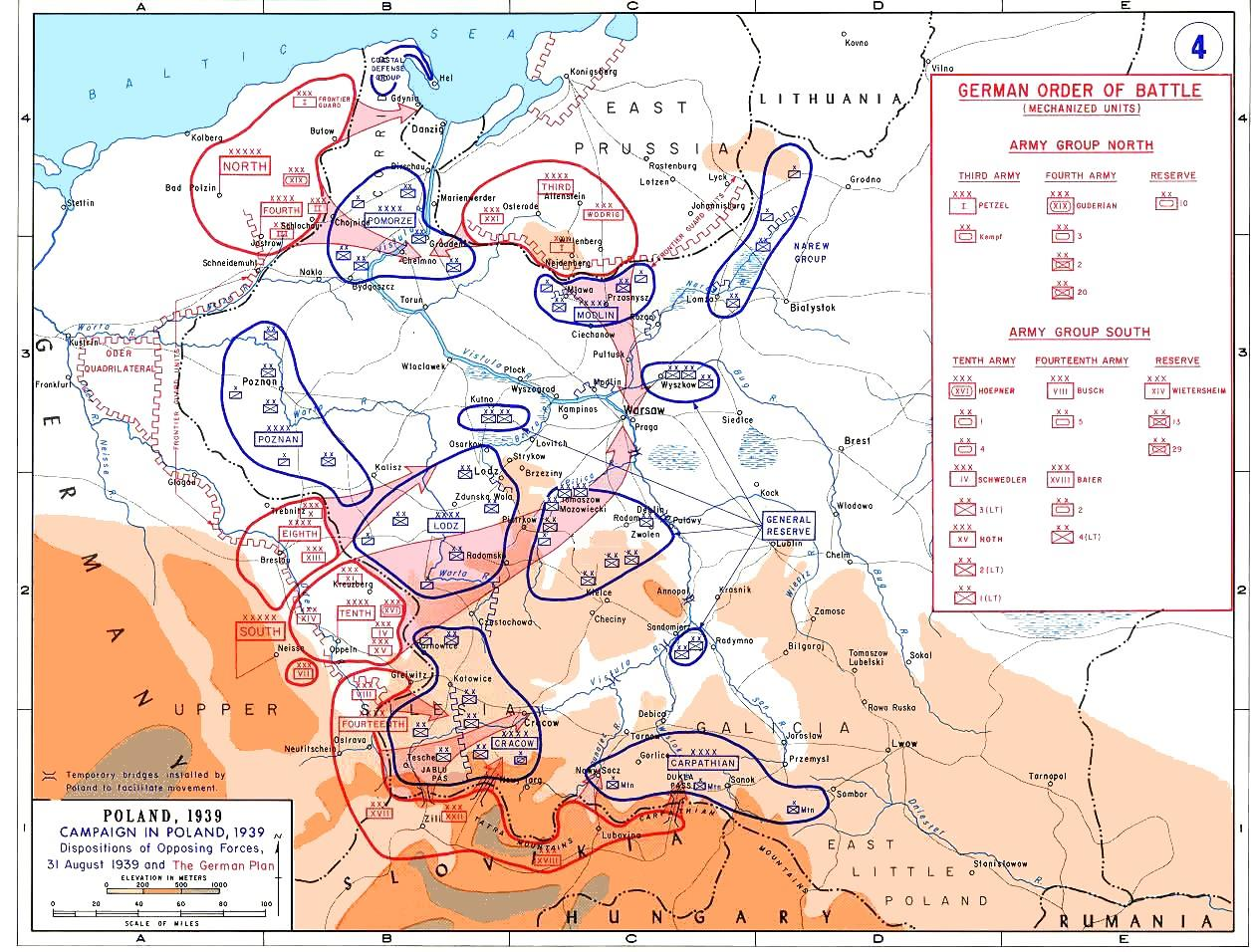
- Forces as of 31 August and German plan of attack
Date	1–4 September 1939
Location	Poland, partially Germany
Result	German victory

Belligerents
Germany	Poland

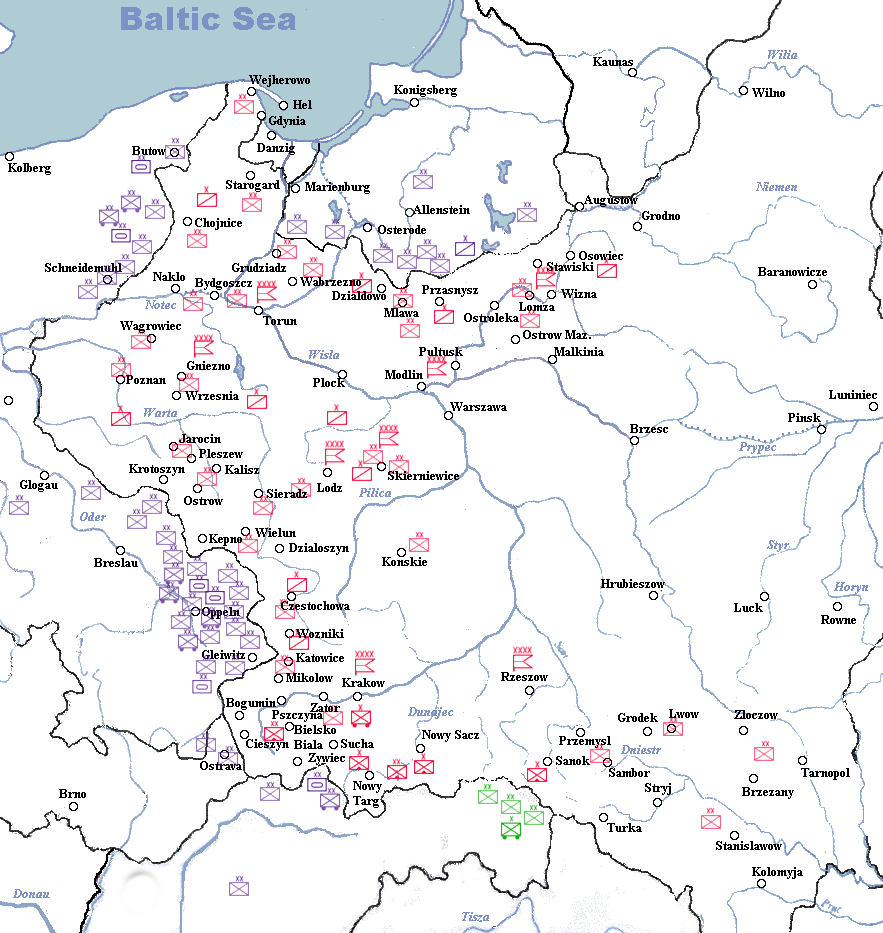
Placement of divisions on 1 September 1939

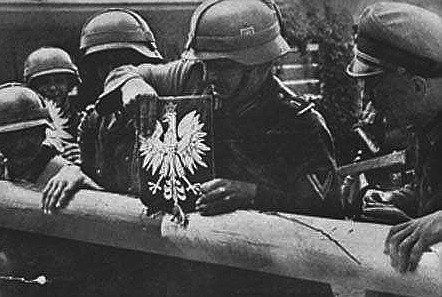
Soldiers of the German Wehrmacht tearing down the border crossing into Poland, 1 September 1939

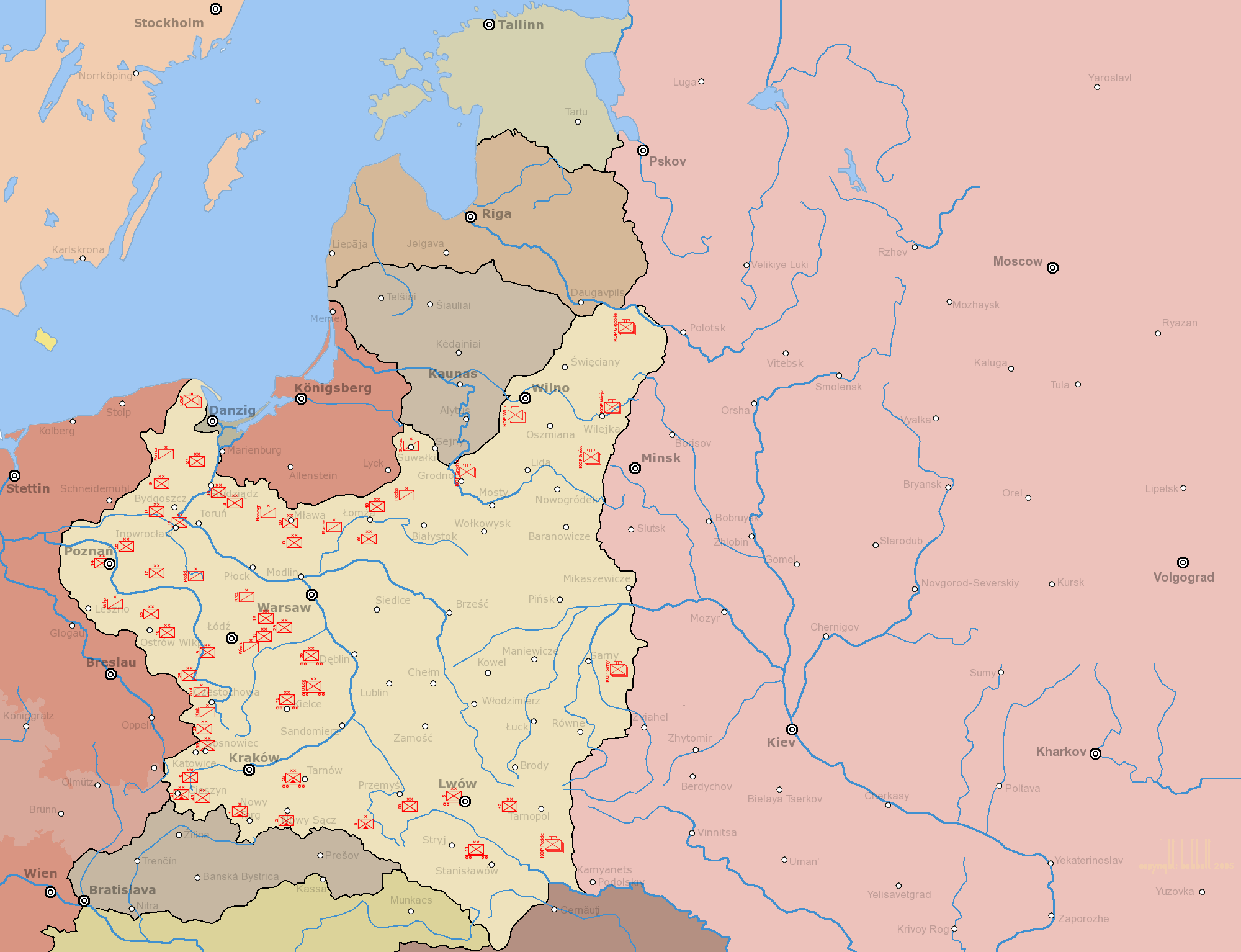
Another map of placement of Polish forces on 1 September

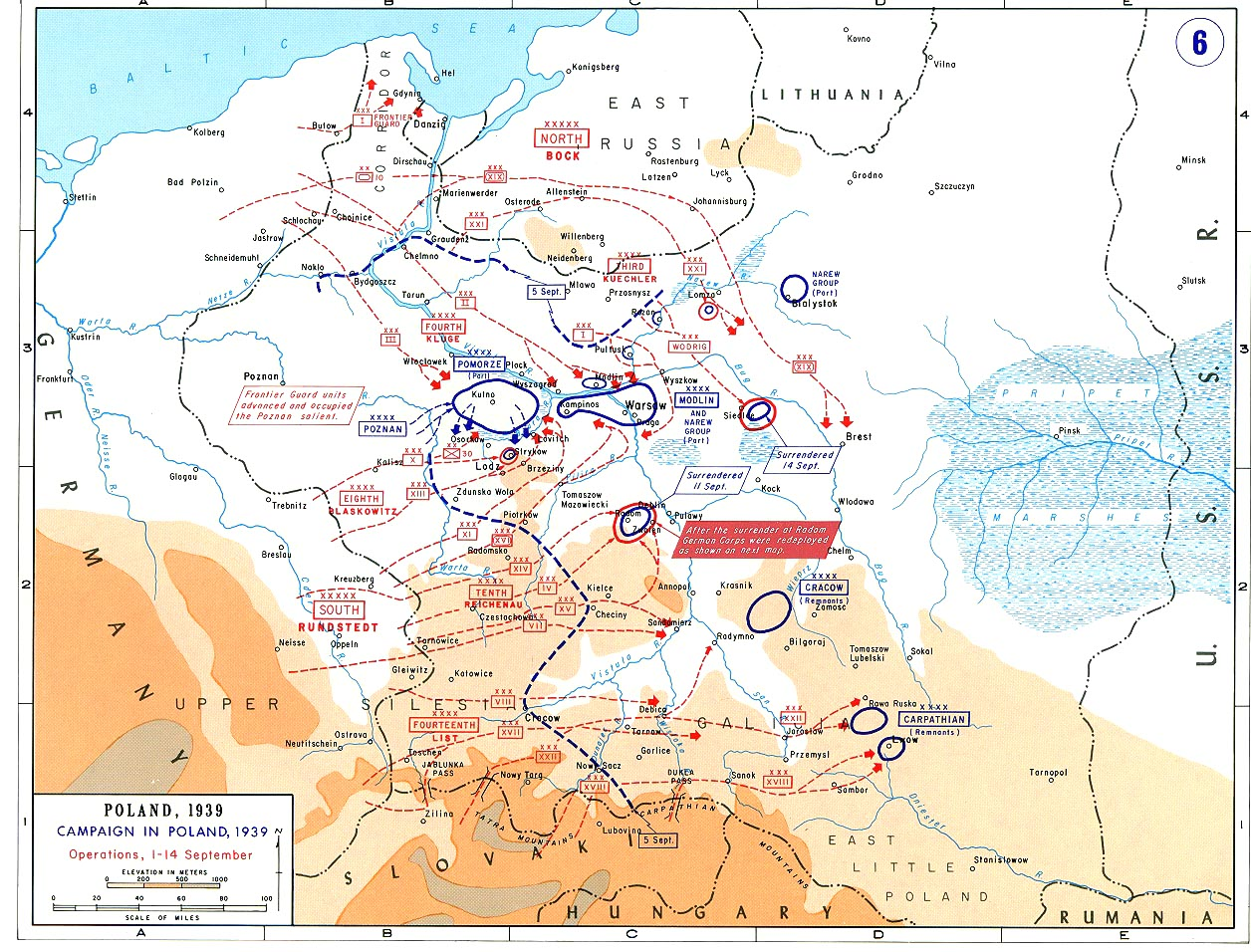
Forces as of 14 September with troop movements up to this date

The Battle of the Border (Polish: Bitwa graniczna) were a series of battles that occurred in the first days of the German invasion of Poland in September 1939. The series of battles ended in a German victory, as Polish forces were either destroyed or forced to retreat.

== Before the battle ==
The Polish defense plan (Plan Zachód) called for a defense of Poland's borders in case of invasion from Germany. Much of Poland's new industry and major population centers were located in the border area (particularly in Silesia); however, the lengthy border was very difficult to defend properly. The plan was criticized by some of the Polish military and Western advisors, but supported by politicians who feared the effect of abandoning a significant part of the population to the enemy without a fight, and who were further discouraged from abandoning those territories as the Polish allies (France and the United Kingdom) did not guarantee the Borders of Poland and might well decide to allow the Germans to take the Polish Corridor they demanded in exchange for peace (pursuing a policy of appeasement).

The German invasion plan (Fall Weiss) called for the start of hostilities before the declaration of war and for German units to invade Poland from three directions:

- from the German mainland through the western Polish border
- from the north, from the exclave of East Prussia
- from the territory of Slovakia, accompanied by allied Slovak units

All three assaults were to converge on Warsaw, while the main Polish army was to be encircled and destroyed west of the Vistula.

Poland, which already had a smaller population and thus a smaller military budget and army than Germany, was further disadvantaged because Poland was unsure whether the war would start already, and its armed forces were not fully mobilized by 1 September.

== Battle ==
The Battle of the Border begun around 05:00, as German troops started crossing the Polish border in numerous places. The Battle of Westerplatte, which is often described as having begun at 04:45 with the salvos of SMS Schleswig-Holstein on Polish coastal fortifications, is commonly described as the first battle of the war. Other sources have described the 04:45 salvos as happening "minutes after Luftwaffe attacks on Polish airfields". Several historians identify the first action of the war as the bombing of the key Tczew bridge in the Polish Corridor by dive bombers from Sturzkampfgeschwader 1 around 04:30. The Polish historian Jarosław Tuliszka noted that a number of German units had started hostilities across the border before shots were fired at Westerplatte. The false flag Operation Himmler had begun hours earlier.

At 08:00 on 1 September, German troops, still without a formal declaration of war being issued, attacked near the Polish town of Mokra, and the Battle of the Border had begun. Later that day, the Germans opened fronts along Poland's western, southern and northern borders while German aircraft began raids on Polish cities. The main routes of attack led eastwards from Germany proper through the western Polish border. A second route carried supporting attacks from East Prussia in the north, and there was a co-operative German-Slovak tertiary attack by units (Field Army Bernolák) from the territory of German-allied Slovakia in the south. All three assaults converged on the Polish capital of Warsaw.

In the northwest, the German Army Group North, under Fedor von Bock, attacked Pomerania and Greater Poland by moving from Germany proper (German Fourth Army) and from East Prussia (German Third Army). During the Battle of Tuchola Forest, which lasted from 1 to 5 September, they split the Polish Army Pomorze, under Władysław Bortnowski, who was tasked with the defence of the Polish Corridor. Parts of it, under Admiral Józef Unrug, would continue to defend pockets of the coast over the next few days or weeks (at the battles of Westerplatte, Gdynia, Hel and others), but the rest was forced, together the Army Poznań under Tadeusz Kutrzeba, to retreat east from their defensive lines in Greater Poland towards Kłodawa, in Kujawy.

In northern Poland (Masovia), by 3 September, part of the German Third Army had defeated the Polish Army Modlin under Emil Krukowicz-Przedrzymirski at the Battle of Mława. The Polish forces retreated towards their secondary lines of defence at the Vistula and Narew rivers, which allowed the Germans to move towards their main objective, Warsaw.

In the south and the southwest, the German Army Group South under Gerd von Rundstedt struck along the lines dividing the Polish Army Łódź (under Juliusz Rómmel) from Army Poznań (north) and Army Kraków (south, under Antoni Szylling). Despite several Polish tactical victories (such as at the Battle of Mokra on 1 September), the Polish forces were soon forced to retreat, as Army Łódź was being outflanked by the German Eighth Army and the German Tenth Army. Army Kraków was retreating from Silesia, and in the south, Army Karpaty under Kazimierz Fabrycy was being slowly pushed north towards the Dunajec and the Nida rivers by the German Fourteenth Army.

By 6 September, Polish forces were in retreat, and Marshal of Poland Edward Rydz-Śmigły ordered all troops to fall back to the secondary lines of defences at the vistula and San rivers.

== Aftermath ==
Virtually all battles that are considered part of the Battle of the Border (except for the Battle of Hel, which lasted for more than a month, and the Battle of Mokra, a Polish defensive victory) resulted in the rapid defeat of Polish forces, which were forced to abandon the regions of Pomerania, Greater Poland and Silesia. Those defeats, in turn, made it more difficult for the Polish forces to fall back in an organised way to the secondary lines of defence (behind the Vistula and near the Romanian Bridgehead).

== List of battles ==
The Battle of the Border included the following battles:

That ended before or on 3 September:

- Defense of the Polish Post Office in Danzig - 1 September
- Battle of Chojnice- 1 September
- Skirmish of Krojanty - 1 September
- Battle of Lasy Królewskie - 1 September
- Battle of Mokra - 1 September
- Defense of Katowice - 3 to 4 September
- Battle of Pszczyna - 1 to 4 September
- Battle of Grudziądz - 1 to 3 September
- Battle of Mława and Ciechanow - 1 to 4 September
- Battle of Jordanów - 2 September
- Raid on Fraustadt - 2 September
- Battle of Węgierska Górka - 1 to 3 September

That began before 3 September and ended before or on 7 September:

- Battle of Tuchola Forest - 1 to 5 September
- Battle of Borowa Góra - 2 to 5 September
- Battle of Westerplatte - 1 to 7 September

That began after 3 September and ended before or on 7 September:

- Battle of Różan - 4 to 6 September
- Battle of Piotrków Trybunalski - 5 to 6 September
- Battle of Tomaszów Mazowiecki - 6 September

That began before 7 September and lasted afterwards:

- Battle of Wizna - 6 to 10 September
- Battle of Hel - 1 September to 2 October

and many other battles and defenses.

== See also ==
- German order of battle for Operation Fall Weiss
- Opposing forces in the Polish September Campaign
- Polish army order of battle in 1939
- List of World War II military equipment of Poland
- List of German military equipment of World War II
