= Stanisław Sosabowski =

Polish general (1892–1967)

Stanisław Sosabowski CBE
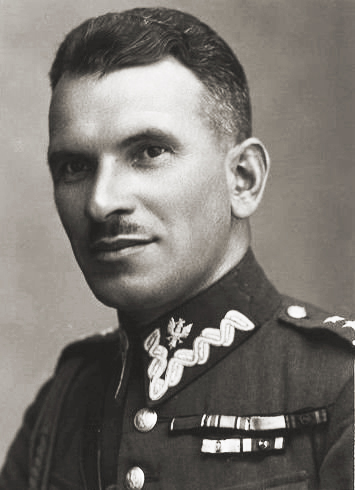
- Born: 8 May 1892; Stanislau, Galicia, Austria-Hungary (now Ivano-Frankivsk, Ukraine)
- Died: 25 September 1967 (aged 75); Hillingdon, London, England
- Burial place: Powązki Military Cemetery, Warsaw
- Military career
- Allegiance: Austria-Hungary (1913–1918); Second Polish Republic (1918–1946)
- Branch: Austro-Hungarian Army; Polish Land Forces
- Service years: 1913–1946
- Rank: Brigadier General
- Commands: 21st Infantry Regiment; 1st Independent Parachute Brigade
- Conflicts: World War I; Polish-Soviet War; World War II (Invasion of Poland, Battle of Mława, Battle of Arnhem)
- Awards: Knight's Cross of the Virtuti Militari; Dutch Bronze Lion

Stanisław Franciszek Sosabowski CBE (Polish pronunciation: [staˈɲiswaf sɔsaˈbɔfskʲi]; 8 May 1892 – 25 September 1967) was a Polish general in World War II. He fought in the Polish Campaign of 1939 and at the Battle of Arnhem (Netherlands), as a part of Operation Market Garden, in 1944 as commander of the Polish 1st Independent Parachute Brigade.

== Early military career ==
=== Early years and studies ===
Stanisław Sosabowski was born on 8 May 1892 in Stanislau (Polish: Stanisławów), in what was then Austria-Hungary and is now Ivano-Frankivsk in western Ukraine. His father was a railway worker. His father died in 1904. In 1905, he became involved in the independence movement, first as part of the Association of the Polish Youth "Zet", then in the Organisation of Independent Youth Zarzewie. He also became a member of the Polish Military Association, where he was actively involved under the pseudonym "Stanisław Węglarz". Sosabowski graduated from a local gymnasium and in 1910 he was accepted as a student of the faculty of economy of the Jagiellonian University in Kraków. However, the death of his father and the poor financial situation of his family forced him to abandon his studies and return to Stanislau. There he became a member of Drużyny Strzeleckie, a semi-clandestine Polish national paramilitary organisation. He was soon promoted to the head of all Polish Scouting groups in the area.

=== World War I ===
In 1913, Sosabowski was drafted into the Austro-Hungarian Army. After training, he was promoted to the rank of corporal, serving in the Imperial and Royal 58th Infantry Regiment. After the outbreak of World War I he fought with his unit against the Imperial Russian Army in the battles of Rzeszów, Dukla Pass and Gorlice. For his bravery, he was awarded the Silver Medal for Bravery 2nd Class and the Gold Medal for Bravery and promoted to first lieutenant. In 1915, he was badly wounded in action in a skirmish against the Russians near Brest-on-the-Bug and withdrawn from the front.

In November 1918, after Poland regained its independence Sosabowski volunteered for the newly formed Polish Army, but his wounds were still not healed and he was rejected as a front-line officer. Instead, he became a staff officer in the Ministry of War Affairs in Warsaw.

=== Interwar period ===
After the Polish–Soviet War Sosabowski was promoted to major and in 1922 he started his studies at the Higher Military School in Warsaw. After he finished his studies he was assigned to the Polish General Staff. Promoted to lieutenant colonel, in 1928 he was finally assigned to a front-line unit, the 75th Infantry Regiment, as commanding officer of a battalion. The following year he was assigned to the 3rd Podhale Rifles Regiment as its deputy commander. From 1930 he was also a professor of logistics at his alma mater.

In 1937 Sosabowski was promoted to colonel and became the commanding officer of the 9th Polish Legions Infantry Regiment stationed in Zamość. In January 1939 he became the commander of the prestigious Warsaw-based 21st "Children of Warsaw" Infantry Regiment.

== Invasion of Poland 1939 ==
According to the Polish mobilisation scheme, Sosabowski's regiment was attached to the 8th Infantry Division under Col. Teodor Furgalski. Shortly before the German invasion of Poland started his unit was moved from its garrison in the Warsaw Citadel to the area of Ciechanów, where it was planned as a strategic reserve of the Modlin Army.

On 2 September the division was moved towards Mława and in the early morning of the following day it entered combat in the Battle of Mława. Although the 21st Regiment managed to capture Przasnysz and its secondary objectives, the rest of the division was surrounded by the Wehrmacht and destroyed. After that Sosabowski ordered his troops to retreat towards Warsaw.

On 8 September Sosabowski's unit reached the Modlin Fortress. The routed 8th Division was being reconstructed, but the 21st Regiment was attached to the corps led by general Juliusz Zulauf. After several days of defensive fights, the corps was moved to Warsaw, where it arrived on 15 September.

Instantly upon arrival, Sosabowski was ordered to man the Grochów and the Kamionek defensive area and defend Praga, the eastern borough of Warsaw, against the German 10th Infantry Division. During the Siege of Warsaw the forces of Sosabowski were outmanned and outgunned, but managed to hold all their objectives. When the general assault on Praga started on 16 September, the 21st Infantry Regiment managed to repel the attacks of German 23rd Infantry Regiment and then successfully counter-attacked and destroyed the enemy unit.

After this success, Sosabowski was assigned to command all Polish troops fighting in the area of Grochów. Despite constant bombardment and German attacks repeated every day, Sosabowski managed to hold his objectives at relatively low cost in manpower. On 26 September 1939, the forces led by Sosabowski bloodily repelled the last German attack, but two days later Warsaw capitulated. On 29 September, shortly before the Polish forces left Warsaw for German captivity, General Juliusz Rómmel awarded Col. Sosabowski and the whole 21st Infantry Regiment with the Virtuti Militari medal.

== France ==
Following the Polish surrender, Sosabowski was made a prisoner of war and interned at a camp near Żyrardów. However, he escaped and remained in Warsaw under a false name, where he joined the Polish resistance. He was ordered to leave Poland and reached France to report on the situation in occupied Poland. After a long trip through Hungary and Romania, he arrived in Paris, where the Polish government in exile assigned him to the Polish 4th Infantry Division as the commanding officer of infantry.

Initially, the French authorities were very reluctant to hand over the badly needed equipment and armament for the Polish unit. Sosabowski's soldiers had to train with pre-World War I weapons. In April 1940, the division was moved to a training camp in Parthenay for an advanced artillery training course under French auspices, and the soldiers was finally handed the weapons awaited since January, but it was already too late to organise the division. Out of more than 11,000 soldiers, only 3,150 were given arms. Knowing this, the commander of the division General Rudolf Dreszer ordered his unit to withdraw towards the Atlantic coast. On 19 June 1940, Sosabowski with approximately 6,000 Polish soldiers arrived at La Pallice, whence they were evacuated to Great Britain.

== Great Britain ==
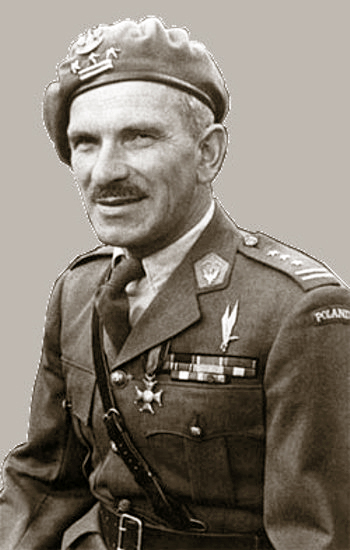
Colonel Sosabowski, c. 1942

Upon his arrival in London, Sosabowski turned up at the Polish General Staff and was assigned to 4th Rifles Brigade that was to become a core of the future 4th Infantry Division. The unit was to be composed mainly of Polish Canadians, but it soon became apparent that there were not enough young Poles in Canada from which to create a division.

Then, Sosabowski decided to transform his brigade into a Parachute Brigade, the first such unit in the Polish Army. The volunteers came from all the formations of the Polish Army. In Largo House in Fife, a training camp was built and the parachute training was started. Sosabowski himself passed the training and, at 49 years of age, made his first parachute jump. According to relations of Sosabowski's former subordinates, the colonel was a strict yet just commander. Impulsive and harsh, Sosabowski could not stand opposition and demanded loyalty.

In October 1942 the Brigade was ready for combat and was named the 1st Independent Parachute Brigade. Since the Polish General Staff planned to use the Brigade to assist a national uprising in Poland, particularly Warsaw, the soldiers of the 1st Polish Para were to be the first element of the Polish Army in Exile to reach their homeland. Hence the unofficial motto of the unit: by the shortest road (najkrótszą drogą).

In September 1943, Lieutenant-General Frederick Browning proposed that Sosabowski reform his unit into a division and fill the remaining posts with British troops. Sosabowski himself would be assigned to the newly formed division and promoted to general. However, Sosabowski refused. Nevertheless, on 15 June 1944 he was promoted to Brigadier General.

== Warsaw Uprising ==
In early August 1944, news of the Warsaw Uprising arrived in Great Britain. The Brigade was ready to be dropped by parachute into Warsaw to aid their comrades from the underground Polish Home Army, who were fighting a desperate battle against overwhelming odds. However, the distance was too great for the transport aircraft to make a round trip and access to Soviet airfields was denied. The morale of the Polish troops suffered badly and many of the units verged on mutiny. The British staff threatened its Polish counterpart with disarmament of the Brigade, but Sosabowski retained control of his unit. Finally, Polish Commander in Chief Kazimierz Sosnkowski put the Brigade under British command, and the plan to send it to Warsaw was abandoned. It was not until after the war that General Sosabowski learnt that his son, Stanisław "Stasinek" Sosabowski, a student of Medecin and member of the Kedyw, had been hit by a grenade during the Warsaw Uprising, causing him to lose the sight in his second eye.

== Battle of Arnhem ==
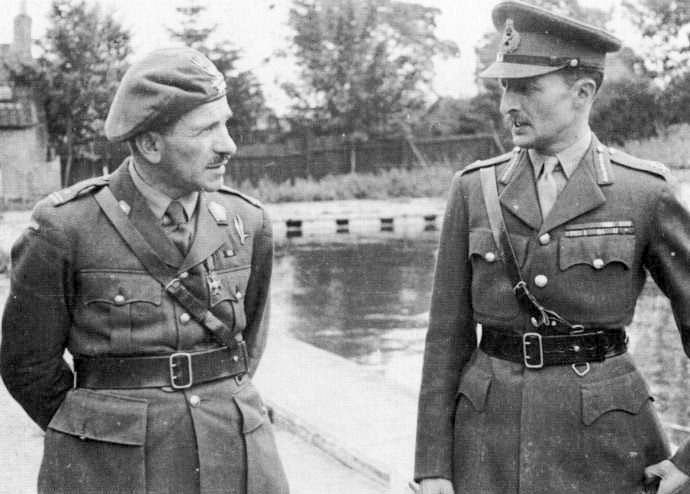
Gen. Sosabowski (left) with Lt-Gen Frederick Browning, commander of the British 1st Airborne Corps.

During the planning for Operation Market Garden, Sosabowski expressed serious concerns regarding the feasibility of the mission. Among Sosabowski's concerns were the poorly conceived drop zones at Arnhem, the long distances between the landing zones and Arnhem Bridge and that the area would contain a greater German presence than British intelligence believed. Despite Sosabowski's concerns and similar warnings from the Dutch Resistance that two SS Panzer Divisions were in the operations area, Market Garden proceeded as planned.

The Polish 1st Independent Parachute Brigade was among the Allied forces taking part in Market Garden. Due to a shortage of transport aircraft, the brigade was split into several parts before being dropped into the battle. A small part of the brigade with Sosabowski was parachuted near Driel on 19 September, but the rest of the brigade arrived only on 21 September at the distant town of Grave, falling directly on the waiting guns of the Germans camped in the area. The brigade's artillery was dropped with the British 1st Airborne Division, commanded by Major-General Roy Urquhart, while the howitzers were to arrive by sea, which prevented the brigade from being deployed effectively. Three times Sosabowski attempted to cross the Rhine to come to the assistance of the surrounded 1st Airborne Division. Unfortunately, the ferry they hoped to use had been sunk and the Poles attempting to cross the river in small rubber boats came under heavy fire. Even so, at least 200 men made it across the river and reinforced the embattled British paratroopers.

Despite the difficult situation, at a staff meeting on 24 September, Sosabowski suggested that the battle could still be won. He proposed that the combined forces of XXX Corps, under Lieutenant-General Brian Horrocks, and the Polish 1st Independent Parachute Brigade should start an all-out assault on the German positions and try to break through the Rhine. This plan was not accepted, and during the last phase of the battle, on 25 and 26 September, Sosabowski led his men southwards, shielding the retreat of the remnants of the 1st Airborne Division. Casualties among the Polish units were high, approaching 40%, and were at least in part the result of Lieutenant-General Browning's decision to drop the paratroops 7 kilometres from the bridge at Arnhem.

After the battle, on 5 October 1944, Sosabowski received a letter from Field Marshal Bernard Montgomery, commander of the Anglo-Canadian 21st Army Group, describing the Polish soldiers as having fought bravely and offering awards to ten of his soldiers. However, on 14 October 1944, Montgomery wrote another letter, this time to the British commanders, in which he scapegoated Sosabowski for the failure of Market Garden. Sosabowski was accused of criticizing Montgomery, and the Polish General Staff was forced to remove him as the commanding officer of his brigade on 27 December 1944.

In the opinion of historian Michael Alfred Peszke, "The worst thing that a subordinate can do is to question orders and to be proved right." Sosabowski had expressed doubts about the feasibility of the Market Garden Operation.

At the Moscow Conference in October 1944, a turning point came in Anglo-Polish relations. On Prime Minister Churchill's request, the Polish delegation arrived in Moscow on 12 October 1944. Upon arrival, Churchill told them to be present at the discussions between himself, Soviet ruler Joseph Stalin, and the Communist Polish Lublin Committee. Churchill coerced Polish Prime Minister Stanisław Mikołajczyk into cooperating with Stalin or risk losing Britain's support for the remainder of the war. From the British perspective, any news that could be beneficial to their coercion tactics would be welcome. The information came on 16 October in a telegram to Field Marshal Sir Alan Brooke, the Chief of the Imperial General Staff, who was present in Moscow as Churchill's military advisor.

The message stated that Sosabowski's brigade performed badly. Churchill could use this claim to put more pressure on Mikołajczyk to cooperate, because it could be argued that one of his most valuable assets, Sosabowski's elite brigade, was no longer useful to the Allied war effort. Montgomery's telegram is contradictory to most of his behaviour at the time. Two days before sending the telegram he was praising the Polish contribution to the war, while six weeks later he awarded a Distinguished Service Order to General Stanisław Maczek and decorated members of the Polish 1st Armoured Division. In addition, war correspondents spoke highly of the Polish contribution to Market Garden in the same period as Montgomery was expressing his negative experiences, via Field Marshal Brooke, to Churchill.

Sosabowski was eventually made the commander of rearguard troops and was demobilized in July 1948.

== After the war ==
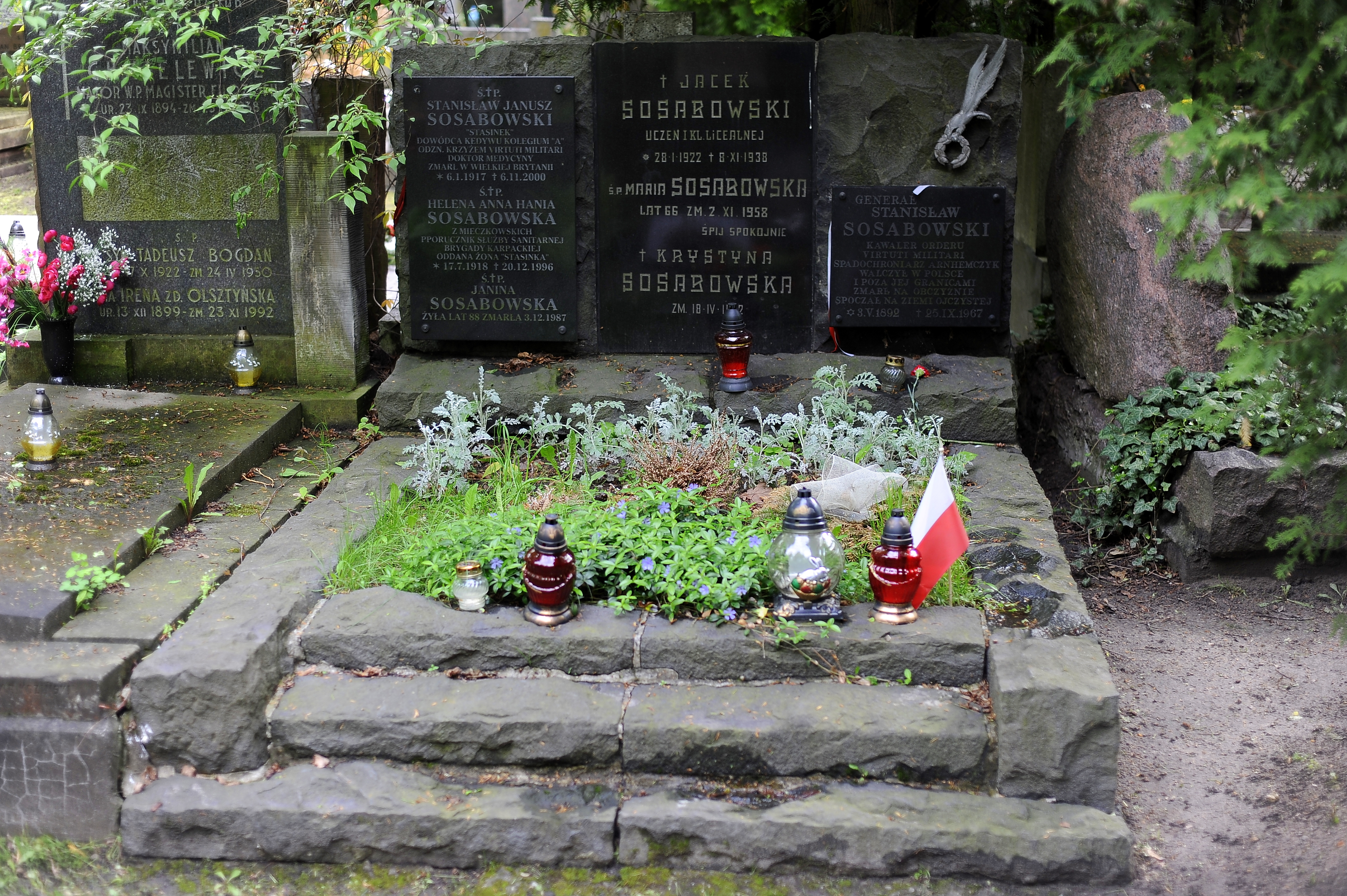
The resting place of General Sosabowski and his family, Powązki Military Cemetery, Warsaw

Shortly after the war Sosabowski succeeded in evacuating his wife and only son from Poland. Like many other Polish wartime officers and soldiers who were unable to return to Communist Poland due to the risk of death or "disappearance", he settled in West London, finding a job as a factory worker at the CAV Electrics assembly plant in Acton.

All Polish Generals who fought under the Allied forces; General Anders, General Maczek and General Sosabowski were denied pension after being relieved of their duties. It has never been proven but the popular belief in Poland is that somehow Stalin had leverage over the British and therefore denied general Sosabowski his honour and pension.

== Death ==
Sosabowski died in London on 25 September 1967. In 1969, his ashes were returned to Poland, where he was reinterred at Powązki Military Cemetery in Warsaw.

== Legacy: depictions and recognitions ==
Sosabowski was portrayed by Gene Hackman in the award-winning 1977 war film A Bridge Too Far.

In The Hague, on 31 May 2006, Queen Beatrix of the Netherlands awarded the Military Order of William to the Polish 1st Independent Parachute Brigade. The brigade's commander, Sosabowski, was posthumously awarded the "Bronze Lion". In part this was the result of a Dutch TV documentary depicting the brigade as having played a far more significant role in Market Garden than had been hitherto acknowledged. In this film by Geertjan Lassche, the father of the Queen, Prince Bernhard of the Netherlands, said the Poles deserved to be honoured with the highest military medal.

The following day, on 1 June, a ceremony was held at Driel, the town where the Polish 1st Independent Parachute Brigade fought. Among the speakers at the ceremony were the mayor of Overbetuwe, as well as Sosabowski's 2 grandsons and 3 great-grandchildren.

In the summer of 2012 1st Airborne Major Tony Hibbert made a video appeal for Sosabowski to be pardoned and honoured.

His bust was unveiled on 1 September 2013 in Kraków's Jordan Park. Sosabowski is one of many Polish historical figures honoured in the Park.

In 2018, at a ceremony held at the Royal Castle in Warsaw on the 100th anniversary of Poland regaining its independence, Polish President Andrzej Duda posthumously conferred the country's highest distinction, the Order of the White Eagle, upon 25 distinguished Poles including Sosabowski.

The elite Polish 6th Airborne Brigade, which traces its traditions back to the 1st Independent Parachute Brigade, is officially named 6 Brygada Powietrznodesantowa im. gen. bryg. Stanisława Franciszka Sosabowskiego, in honor of Sosabowski.

In September 2023, the Polish School in Glasgow, a Saturday complementary school, decided to adopt the name of General Sosabowski as its patron. The honours to the famous patron were celebrated with the Polish and British parachute corps, and the veterans' organisations.

Sosabowski was awarded many military honours, including:

- Knight's Cross of the Virtuti Militari
- Commander's Cross with Star of the Order of Polonia Restituta (posthumously, 1988)
- Cross of Independence
- Polish Cross of Valour
- Gold Cross of Merit with Swords
- Honorary Commander of the Order of the British Empire
- Bronze Lion Award for Bravery (Netherlands, posthumously, 2006)

== See also ==
- Polish contribution to World War II
- Polish Armed Forces in the West
- Cichociemni
- Stanisław Maczek
- Western betrayal
- Władysław Sikorski
