= Battle of Pułtusk (1939) =

Date	6 – 7 September 1939
Location	Pułtusk
Result	German victory

Belligerents
(Second Polish Republic) Poland	(Nazi Germany) Germany

Commanders and leaders
(Second Polish Republic) Jan Kazimierz Mazur	(Nazi Germany) Siegfried Haenicke

Units involved
1st Legions Infantry Regiment 13th Infantry Regiment (Poland) Battalion National Defense (Poland) Battalion Warsaw III 3rd Battalion of 115th Reserve Regiment 12th field artillery platoon	61st Infantry Division (Wehrmacht)

The Battle of Pułtusk (1939) was a battle between the Polish Army and the German Wehrmacht in Pultusk, Poland in the first week of World War II.

The battle started on 6 September 1939 with an attack by German forces on Polish positions. After repelling several German attacks, the Polish Army was forced to withdraw on 7 September to prevent encirclement.

== Preparations ==
The fortification of Pułtusk began on August 7, 1939, when surveyors arrived to plan out the fortifications layout. The fortifications included numerous reinforced concrete bunkers as well as trenches, barbed wire, landmines and anti-tank fortifications. Work on the fortifications was carried out by the sappers company of the Border Protection Corps "Wilejka" under Captain Sapper Teodor Engel from the Vilnius region, assisted by the locally stationed 13th Infantry Regiment, especially the platoon of pioneers in the regiment.

The 13th Infantry Regiment left the Pultusk area on August 24 leaving behind a marching battalion under Captain Wachtang Abszydze. It was reinforced by the National Defense Battalion Warsaw III under Captain Stanisław Gustowski and the 3rd Battalion of the 115th Reserve Regiment under Major Jan Kazimierz Mazur, who took overall command of the three battalions.

The 3rd Battalion of the 115th Reserve Regiment would defend the north of Pułtusk, the Warsaw III National Defense Battalion would defend the west and the 13th Infantry Regiment Battalion defend the south.

The defenders had artillery support from the 12th field artillery platoon and anti-aircraft support.

== Prelude ==
The main aim of the Polish forces in Pultusk was to protect the bridges over the Narew River so they could be used in a counter-attack.

On 5 September 1939, the Invasion of Poland began. After the defeat of the 8th Polish Infantry Division near Grudusk, the survivors arrived in Pultusk . A day later the Mazowiecka BK passed through it. Together with the 1st Legion Infantry Regiment, who had arrived by train, the unit took up positions on the east bank of the Narew River south and north of Pułtusk. The 1st Legion artillery had greater range than the 12th field artillery platoon as well as more artillery pieces and shells which significantly increased the defenders' firepower.

== The battle ==
The Germans attacked at dawn on 6 September with motorized units of the 155th Infantry Regiment of the 61st infantry Division from the Ciechanów Highway. The 151st Infantry Regiment attacked North of the road and the 176th from the same division to the South. The morning attacks were halted by the Polish defenders.

Before the evening the Germans attacked a Polish section. After allowing the Germans to get close, the Polish troops opened fire. The ensuing engagement led to hand-to-hand combat during which the Germans withdrew.

A northern attack by the Germans lead to them taking control of a brick yard located between two Polish sections. However the battalions of both sections counterattacked and pushed the Germans out of the brick yard. The last night attack went south and was withstood by the march Battalion of the 13th infantry Regiment with difficulty.

Polish Brigader general Wincenty Kowalski, commander of operational group "Wyszków" and the 1st Infantry Division, soon arrived in Pultusk. When told that Rozan had fallen to the Germans, Kowalski realized that continued defence of Pułtusk was untenable and ordered a retreat.

== See also ==
- List of World War II military equipment of Poland
- List of German military equipment of World War II
