= 8th Infantry Division (Poland) =

Combat formation of the Polish Army

The 8th Infantry Division was a tactical unit of the Polish Army. It was active in the Polish-Bolshevik War, as well as during the Invasion of Poland in 1939. During World War II, the division was reformed twice as part of two distinct armed forces: once as part of the Home Army during the Warsaw Uprising and again as part of the Polish Army in the East.

== History ==
=== Polish-Bolshevik War ===
The division was formed at the end of World War I as one of the first large infantry units of the renascent Polish state. It took part in the Polish-Bolshevik War. At the end of the war, in September 1920 the division (then composed of four infantry regiments: 13th, 21st, 33rd and 36th) had 6210 men under arms and formed the core of the Reserves of the General Staff, along with the Siberian Brigade and 20th Infantry Division. As part of Gen. Latinik's Operational Group of Gen. Iwaszkiewicz's Polish 6th Army, the division (then commanded by Col. Stanisław Burhardt-Bukacki) took part in the Battle of Lwów and Polish-Ukrainian operations in Bolshevik-held Ukraine.

After the cease-fire and the Treaty of Riga, the division was partially demobilized and its regiments were stationed in a number of Mazovian towns, including Modlin, Pułtusk, Warsaw, Działdowo and Płock.

=== Outbreak of World War II ===
During the Polish mobilization of 1939, prior to the invasion of Poland, the division was mobilized and dispatched to the area west of Ciechanów, where it was to form a strategic reserve of the Polish Modlin Army defending the Modlin Fortress and the northern approaches to Warsaw. Commanded by Col. Teodor Wyrwa-Furgalski, the unit was to enter combat should the Germans break through the Polish lines. However, already on September 2, the division was dispatched to the area of Mława, where it was to support the Polish units fighting in the Battle of Mława.

The 8th Division arrived in the area in the early hours of September 3. As the Mazowiecka Cavalry Brigade operating further eastwards was also endangered by German armoured troops, the army commander ordered the division to split its forces and attack in two directions: towards Grudusk east of Mława and towards Przasnysz. However, conflicting orders and German saboteurs operating in the rear disrupted both attacks and led to chaos in the Polish ranks. The situation was further complicated by insufficient reconnaissance, which led to several skirmishes between friendly forces. At first, the organic cavalry assaulted the staff company, mistakenly taking it for enemy forces, while later that day the 13th Infantry Regiment assaulted 32nd Infantry Regiment of Lt.Col. Stefan Zając.

In the evening, the division was mostly dispersed and only the 21st Infantry Regiment of Colonel (later General) Stanisław Sosabowski managed to withdraw from the fights towards the Modlin Fortress. His forces were later joined by elements of the 13th Regiment rallied by its commander, while the remnants of the division, including the major part of the 32nd Regiment, were rallied by the division's commanding officer west of Opinogóra. The latter group started a retreat towards Modlin, where it suffered significant casualties from enemy aerial bombardment.

Finally, the division arrived at the Modlin Fortress, where it received reinforcements and manned the defences of the area. The 32nd Regiment manned the Forts No. 1 and 2, the organic artillery (including the 8th Heavy Artillery Detachment) manned the line east of Kazuń. Overnight of September 7, the 21st Regiment arrived in the area, but was then dispatched further southwards to take part in the battle of Warsaw, while the 13th Regiment under Lt.Col. Alojzy Nowak manned the line along the Vistula near Gniewniewice, west of Modlin. Despite being badly shaken in the first days of the war, the division was successfully reorganized and defended its positions until the capitulation of the Modlin Fortress on September 29.

=== Polish Army in the East ===
Following the Sikorski-Mayski Agreement, in February 1942, a Polish division started to be formed in Chok-Pak in Kazakhstan. The new unit, formed primarily of Polish soldiers previously held in Soviet Gulags, was commanded by Col. Bronisław Rakowski and received the name of 8th Infantry Division. However, it did not share the traditions of the pre-1939 unit. Following the evacuation of Polish forces to Persia and then to the Middle East, the division was disbanded and its men were transferred to various other units of the Polish II Corps.

=== Operation Tempest ===
In 1944, during Operation Tempest, the command of the Home Army decided to unite various partisan units into regular divisions that would later form the core of the recreated Polish Army. The new division scheme was based on the pre-war territorial division of the Polish armed forces and the new units not only shared the traditions of their pre-war counterparts, but also a large number of soldiers and officers who were veterans of the pre-war units, who had returned home after the Polish Defensive War. During the Warsaw Uprising, all of the forces of the Warsaw Corps of the Home Army were reorganized into three divisions. One of them, composed of partisan units fighting in the borough of Żoliborz and separated forces fighting in Kampinos Forest, received the name of 8th Romuald Traugutt Infantry Division. Commanded by Lt. Col. Mieczysław Niedzielski (nom de guerre Żywiciel), the unit was composed of the recreated 13th Infantry Regiment (Kampinos) and the 21st, 22nd and 32nd Regiments (Żoliborz), as well as an improvised 7th Uhlans Regiment. The division took part in heavy fighting until the end of the Uprising.

=== Eastern Front ===
After the Soviet take-over of much of Poland in 1944, the Communist authorities started to form the 8th Division of the Polish People's Army in the area of Siedlce. The division, as well as its regiments (32nd, 34th and 36th Infantry, and 37th Light Artillery), received the numbers of the pre-war unit, but did not share its traditions. The new unit, formed in accordance with Soviet rules, became operational in early April 1945. On April 15, it was attached to the Polish 2nd Army and the following day it entered combat in the area of the Lausitzer Neisse river during the Battle of Dresden. After crossing the river, the division - deprived of artillery and air cover - took part in the heavy fighting for Nieder Neudorf and the village of Biehain. On April 17, aided by the badly beaten Polish 16th Armoured Brigade, the division continued its assault on Ober and Mittel Horka defended by the elite Brandenburger Regiment.

After the initial failure, the division managed to break the German resistance in an all-out assault and reached the Weisser Schops River, which it crossed under heavy enemy fire. Then the unit crossed the Neu Graben Canal and captured the towns of Odernitz (36th Regiment) and Niesky (32nd Regiment). The latter town was captured after two days of heavy struggles. In the following days, the division continued the assault with heavy losses, capturing the towns and villages of See, Mocholz, Zischelmuhle and Stockteich. After repelling the German counter-attack south of Niessky, on April 20, the division started a pursuit after the fleeing Germans, breaking the resistance at Gebelzig, Gross Saubernitz, Baruth/Mark and Guttau. On April 25, the division reached the line of Strochschutz-Grossbrosern-Colln, after which it was stopped and then withdrawn to the rear for reinforcement.

=== After the war ===
The division suffered heavy losses in the poorly planned operation in Saxony. Nevertheless, the Communist authorities claimed the operation to be a major success and the division received the name of 8th Dresden Infantry Division and the new patron in the person of Bartosz Głowacki, a Polish 18th century peasant hero (Polish: 8. Drezdeńska Dywizja Piechoty im. Bartosza Głowackiego). Parts of the division (roughly 2,500 men of the 1st, 8th and 36th Regiments) were then attached to the Wisła Operational Group and took part in the infamous Operation Vistula against the Ukrainian Insurgent Army and the civilian population of the Eastern Beskids. The action lasted until July 1947, when the unit was withdrawn and partially demobilized.

On March 30, 1949, the unit was transferred to Western Pomerania and reformed into the Polish 8th Motorized Infantry Division, which became the direct predecessor of the modern 8th Mechanised Division. Both were active within the Pomeranian Military District.

== Order of battle ==
=== 1939 ===
==== Commanders ====
- Commanding officer Lt.Col. Teodor Furgalski
- 1st commander of divisional infantry (deputy commander) Col. Ludwik de Laveaux
- 2nd commander of divisional infantry Lt. Col. Mikołaj Jan Ordyczyński, since September 11 Lt. Col. Jan Domasiewicz
- Staff officers: Capt. Wiktor Jachimiuk, Lt. Stanisław Pancerz
- chief chaplain Ferdynand Zygmunt Wawro
- chief lawyer Maj. Władysław Koreywo
- jury of the court martial Lt. Zygmunt Rose, Lt. Juliusz Kohn

==== Staff ====
- Chief of Staff Lt. Col. Kazimierz Franciszek Marczewski
- Chief of Operations Capt. Adam Szugajew
- Chief of Information Zbigniew Garwacki
- Quartermaster Capt. Stanisław Jerzy Skierski
- Chief of Engineers Maj. Walerian Klimowicz
- Chief of Signals Capt. Michał Standziak
- Chief Armourer Capt. Stefan Karol Łysakowski
- Chief Intendant Capt. Władysław Śniegocki
- Chief Medic Maj. Henryk Lenk
- Staff Headquarters' Commander Maj. Otto Laskowski
- Commanding officer of signals platoon Lt. Czesław Kotyński

==== Units ====
- 13th Infantry Regiment (garrisoned in Pułtusk) Lt. Col. Alojzy Nowak
- 21st Infantry Regiment (garrisoned in Warsaw) Col. Stanisław Sosabowski
- 32nd Infantry Regiment (garrisoned in Modlin) Lt. Col. Stefan Zając
- 8th Regiment of Light Artillery of King Boleslaus the Wrymouth of Poland (garrisoned in Płock) Lt. Col. Jan Damasiewicz
- 8th Regiment of Heavy Artillery (garrisoned in Modlin) Maj. Władysław Niewodniczański
- 8th motorized battery of AA artillery Capt. Józef Franciszek Płodowski
- 89th AA artillery battery (attached) Capt. Janusz Stanisław Klimontowicz
- 8th Engineering Battalion (Tomasz) Maj. Walerian Klimowicz
- 8th Telephone Company Capt. Franciszek Leszczyński
- 11th Bicycle Signals Company Lt. Michał Ptasiński
- Organic cavalry Maj. Jarosław Ciechanowski Sgt. Jan Lewandowski Capt. Samuz Jackóbslen Lt.Józef Ziminski
- 11th independent taczanka HMG company Lt. Kazimierz Bruździński

== See also ==
- Polish army order of battle in 1939
- Polish contribution to World War II
- List of Polish divisions in World War II
