= Geertjan Lassche =

Dutch journalist (born 1976)

Geertjan Lassche (born in Zwolle, 17 August 1976) is a Dutch reporter and documentary film maker.

== Career ==
He started his career in journalism in 1996, at the Zwolse Courant, a local newspaper in Zwolle. At the same time, he worked on a freelance base, among other things for the local stations RTV Oost, Omroep Gelderland, and Radio 1. He also wrote for several Dutch magazines: Nieuwe Revu, Kijk, and Voetbal International. Two years later, a radio documentary by Lassche about the everyday life on a village of farmers was awarded with the second prize at RVU-Radioprijs.

Lassche has been working for the Evangelische Omroep since 2000 for several programs. He reconstructed an attempt at kidnapping Juliana of the Netherlands by South Moluccan radicals and to occupy the Soestdijk Palace. This plot, to be executed in April 1975, was prevented as the General Intelligence and Security Service (BVD) was tipped at the last moment. Etienne Urka, who was befriended with South Moluccans then, confessed to Lassche that he informed the BVD about the RMS plot while in prison.

Lassche became renowned for his report about the 'Forgotten Poles during the Battle for Arnhem', for which he took the last journalistic television-interview with prince Bernhard. Following this documentary, Queen Beatrix honored the 1st Independent Polish Parachute Brigade with the Military Order of William on May 31, 2006. The commander of the Brigade, the late Major General Stanisław Sosabowski, was awarded the "Bronze Lion" posthumously.

The gratitude for this retribution was so great in Poland that Lassche himself was also decorated. On January 30, 2007, he was awarded a military decoration and the civil Golden Cross of Merit. During the ceremony, a grandson of Major General Sosabowski was present.

In 2005 Lassche made a series of reports about the Netherlands's Foreign Law. It was discovered that civil servants of the Immigration and Naturalisation Services had informed the Congolese embassy and authorities that several of the people sent back to the Democratic Republic of Congo had claimed asylum in the Netherlands. This information is considered confidential and should not have been disclosed to the Congolese authorities. Rita Verdonk, then Minister of Immigration, at first denied any wrongdoing on behalf of herself or her civil servants, but later admitted that in several cases the Congolese embassy had been informed that returnees were former applicants for asylum in the Netherlands. For these reports, Lassche got the Gouden Tape, an incentive prize for young journalism television talent.

Lassche's historical documentary t Was maar een mof ('He was just a jerry') revealed the story of the German Wehrmacht soldier Karl-Heinz Rosch during the occupation of the Netherlands in the Second World War, who rescued two Dutch toddlers but was killed himself. This story became well-known nationally and resulted in the dedication of a statue for Rosch.

In 2007, Lassche's revelation of adoption scandals in Colombia, India and China created commotion among adoptive children and parents, adoption offices and the Ministry of Justice. Several independent government researches confirmed the wrongdoing and insisted on better supervision and a new policy.

In 2008, Geertjan Lassche was nominated for De Tegel, the annual Dutch award for journalism.

In 2022, Lassche made a two hour documentary about Louis van Gaal, entitled, Louis, with the tag line "The man behind the legend". It premiered, on April 11, in the Amsterdam Tuschinski Theatre. It was released April 14, 2022.
