= 13th Infantry Regiment (Poland) =

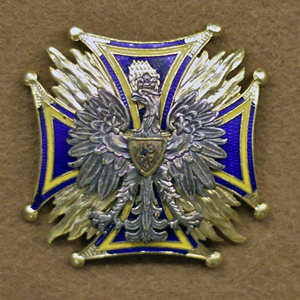
- Active: 7 November 1918 – 29 September 1939; 13 September 1941 – 25 October 1942; 5 July 1944 – 1957
- Country: Second Polish Republic
- Branch: 8th Infantry Division (1919-1939); 5th Infantry Division (1941-1942 and 1944-1945)
- Role: Infantry
- Garrison/HQ: Kraków (1918-1920); Krzemieniec (1920-1921); Pułtusk (1921-1939)
- Engagements: World War I Polish-Ukrainian War: Battle of Lemberg; Polish-Soviet War: Battle of Ossów; Battle of Dytiatyn; May Coup; World War II: Invasion of Poland; Prague offensive

13th Children of Kraków Infantry Regiment (Polish: 13 Pulk Piechoty Dzieci Krakowa, 13 pp) was an infantry regiment of the Polish Army. It existed from 1918 until 1939. It was then reformed two more times between 1941 and 1944 as part of the Polish Armed Forces in the East. Garrisoned first in Kraków, then in Krzemieniec and in 1921–1939 in Pułtusk, the unit belonged to the 8th Infantry Division from Modlin.

== Beginnings ==
The regiment was formed on November 7, 1918, in the village of Madefalda, located in Hungarian Transylvania. On that day, soldiers of the Austro-Hungarian 13th Infantry Regiment, which consisted mostly of ethnic Poles (80%), decided to turn their unit into the 13th Polish Infantry Regiment.

On November 13, the unit reached Kraków by rail, without its weapons and food, which had been taken from them by the Czechs and the Hungarians. At the same time, reserve battalion of the Austro-Hungarian 13th Infantry Regiment, stationed in Olomouc, also pledged its allegiance to the newly restored Poland, and brought to Kraków its money, weapons, ammunition and uniforms.

Following the order of the Polish Military Command of Kraków (Polska Komenda Wojskowa), the 8th Infantry Regiment, consisting of Poles who had served in Austro-Hungarian forces, was formed in mid-November 1918. The new unit took the barracks of King John III Sobieski, and pledged allegiance to Poland in late November in Wawel Castle. On February 8, 1919, the regiment, renamed into the 13th Infantry Regiment, was sent to Lwów, to fight in the Polish-Ukrainian War.

== Wars of 1919–1921 ==
During the Polish-Soviet War, the regiment, which belonged to the 8th Infantry Division, was part of the XV Infantry Brigade. On August 14, 1920, it attacked Soviet positions near Ossów (see Battle of Ossów).

On September 16, 1920, the regiment, commanded by Captain Jan Gabrys, fought in the Battle of Dytiatyn, known in Polish as Thermopylae. Out of approximately 200 soldiers who defended Hill 385, 97 were killed, and another 86 were wounded. In 1930, a church monument was built in the location of the tomb of the soldiers of the regiment. The church was destroyed by Soviet authorities after 1945.

== Second Polish Republic ==
After the war, the regiment was briefly stationed in Lubar, to be transferred to Krzemieniec, on December 2, 1920. In March 1921, it was moved to its permanent location at Pułtusk. During the 1926 May Coup (Poland), it supported the forces of Józef Piłsudski.

Mobilized in August 1939, the regiment was part of its 8th Infantry Division, Modlin Army, and initially fought in the area of Pułtusk.

== Polish Armed Forces in the East ==
On 13 September 1941, the regiment was reformed as part of the Polish Armed Forces in the East. It was then attached to the 5th Infantry Division. On 25 October 1942, the regiment was disbanded in order to form two new battalions for the 5th Infantry Division.

On 5 July 1944, the regiment was once again reformed in the village of Małe Koszaryszcze near the city of Zhytomyr. It participated in the Prague offensive. The regiment was disbanded in 1957.

== Commandants ==
- Colonel Boleslaw Kraupa 1918–1920,
- Colonel Karol Krauss 1920,
- Captain Jan Józef Rój 1920,
- Colonel Krukowski 1920,
- Captain Emil Prochaska 1920,
- Captain Jan Rudolf Gabrys 1920,
- Colonel Czeslaw Mlot-Fijalkowski 1920–1926,
- Colonel Florian Smykal 1926–1929,
- Colonel Jan Zietarski 1929–1935,
- Colonel Jozef Kobylecki 1935–1938,
- Colonel Alojzy Nowak 1938 – KIA 24 September 1939,
- Major Wiktoryn Gieruszczak WIA 24 September 1939,
- Colonel Marian Adam Markiewicz 25–29 September 1939
- Lieutenant Colonel Nikodem Sulik 15 September 1941 - 24 March 1942
- Lieutenant Colonel Wincenty Powichrowski 24 March - 25 October 1942
- Major Łazarz Mojsjen 5 July – 24 September 1944
- Major Mitrofan Żuk 24 September – 2 October 1944
- Lt. Col. Jan Siewko 2 October 1944 – 25 April 1945
- Major Mitrofan Zatulin 25 April – 1 May 1945
- Major Grzegorz Karbowski 1 May 1945 – 9 May 1945
- Lt. Col. Lucjan Józef Kępiński 9 May 1945 – 1952
- Major Zbigniew Czerwiński 1952–1953

== Symbols ==
The flag, funded by the residents of the Counties of Pultusk and Makow Mazowiecki, was handed to the regiment on November 3, 1923, in Pultusk, by President Stanislaw Wojciechowski.

The badge was approved in October 1928. It was in the shape of the cross, with a silver Polish Eagle, and the inscription 13 PP.

== Sources ==
- Komornicki, Stanisław (1965). Wojsko Polskie: krótki informator historyczny o Wojsku Polskim w latach II wojny światowej, T. 1, Regularne jednostki ludowego Wojska Polskiego: formowanie, działania bojowe, organizacja, uzbrojenie, metryki jednostek piechoty [Polish Army: a short historical guide to the Polish Army during World War II, Vol. 1, Regular units of the Polish People's Army: formation, combat operations, organization, armament, infantry unit records] (in Polish). Warsaw: Wydawnictwo Ministerstwa Obrony Narodowej.
- Kronika 13 Wileńskiego Batalionu Strzelców [Chronicle of the 13th Vilnius Rifle Battalion] (PDF) (in Polish). Vol. I. 13 Wileński Batalion Strzelców. 1944. Archived from the original on 2019-02-12.
- Kryska-Karski, Tadeusz; Barański, Henryk (1973). Piechota Polska 1939-1945 Zeszyt nr 13 Materiały Uzupełniające do Księgi Chwały Piechoty Polskiej [Polish Infantry 1939-1945 Issue No. 13 Supplementary Materials to the Book of Glory of the Polish Infantry] (in Polish).
- Piotrowski, Paweł (2003). Śląski Okręg Wojskowy: przekształcenia organizacyjne, 1945–1956 [Silesian Military District: organizational transformations, 1945–1956] (in Polish). Warsaw: Wydawnictwo TRIO: Instytut Pamięci Narodowej. ISBN 8388542532. OCLC 830528040.
- Kazimierz Satora: Opowieści wrześniowych sztandarów. Warsaw: Instytut Wydawniczy Pax, 1990
- Zdzisław Jagiełło: Piechota Wojska Polskiego 1918-1939. Warsaw: Bellona, 2007
- Jerzy Kajetanowicz : Polish Land Forces 1945-1960: combat composition, organizational structures and armament . Toruń; Łysomice: European Educational Center, 2005. ISBN 83-88089-67-6 .

== See also ==
- 1939 Infantry Regiment (Poland)
