= Georg von Küchler =

German general (1881–1968)

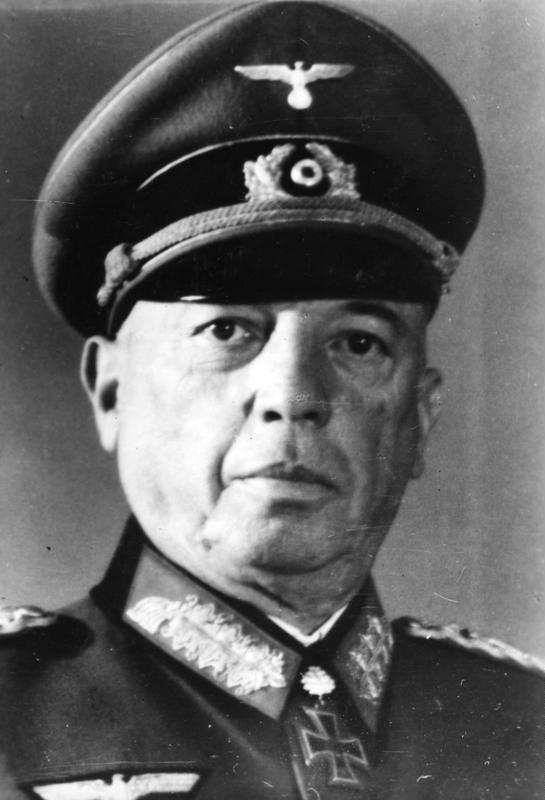
- Küchler in 1943
- Born: Georg Carl Wilhelm Friedrich von Küchler; 30 May 1881; Philippsruhe Manor, Hanau, Kreis Hanau, Hesse-Nassau, Prussia, Germany
- Died: 25 May 1968 (aged 86); Garmisch-Partenkirchen, Landkreis Garmisch-Partenkirchen, Upper Bavaria, Bavaria, West Germany
- Military career
- Allegiance: Germany
- Branch: Imperial German Army; Reichswehr; German Army
- Service years: 1900–1944
- Rank: Generalfeldmarschall
- Commands: 18th Army; Army Group North
- Conflicts: World War I; World War II; Battle of the Netherlands; Battle of France; Operation Barbarossa; Siege of Leningrad; Lyuban Offensive Operation; Sinyavino Offensive
- Awards: See awards

Georg Carl Wilhelm Friedrich von Küchler (30 May 1881 – 25 May 1968) was a German Generalfeldmarschall (Field Marshal) of the Wehrmacht during the Second World War, who was subsequently convicted of war crimes. He commanded the 18th Army and Army Group North during the Soviet-German war of 1941–1945.

After the end of the war, he was tried in the High Command Trial, as part of the Subsequent Nuremberg trials. On 27 October 1948 he was sentenced to 20 years in prison for war crimes and crimes against humanity committed in the Soviet Union. He was released in 1953.

== Early life and World War I ==
Born on 30 May 1881 at Schloss Philippsruhe, Küchler's family were Prussian Junker. He entered the Imperial Army in 1900 as an officer cadet in the artillery. He was posted to the 25th Field Artillery Regiment and the following year was commissioned as a Leutnant (second lieutenant). He remained in his regiment until 1907, when he was assigned to Military Riding School. He received a promotion to Oberleutnant (first lieutenant) in 1910 and studied at the Prussian Military Academy for three years. He joined the Greater General Staff in Berlin after his graduation from the academy in 1913.

When World War I commenced, Küchler was sent to the Western Front. Now a Hauptmann (captain), he was given command of an artillery battery. He participated in the battles at the Somme and Verdun and later in the Champagne Province. Within months of arriving on the Western Front, he had been awarded both the first and second classes of the Iron Cross.

After serving on the frontlines, Küchler performed staff duties at IV Corps and later VIII Corps. By the end of 1916 he was the 'Staff Officer, Operations' with the 206th Infantry Division. He returned to Germany later in the war to take a similar post with 8th Reserve Division. By the end of the war he was serving of the staff of Rüdiger von der Goltz, commander of the Baltic Sea Division. After the armistice and still in the Baltics, he joined the Freikorps and fought the Red Army in Poland.

== Interwar period ==
After the war, Küchler was retained in the postwar Reichswehr. He initially served in the East Prussian military district (Wehrkreis I) before being given command of a battery in the 5th Artillery Regiment. Promoted to major in 1924, he was appointed Commandant of Münster for a time, before serving with the Defence Ministry as inspector of schools. By 1931 he had reached the rank of Oberst (colonel) and the following year was deputy commander of what was to become the 1st Infantry Division. By 1934 he was commander of the division having been promoted to Generalmajor (Note: In the Wehrmacht, the rank of Generalmajor was equivalent to a brigadier general in the United States Army.) that October. He received a further promotion the next year, to Generalleutnant and a new posting, Inspector of Army Schools.

In 1938 Küchler supported Adolf Hitler in his removal of Werner von Blomberg and Werner von Fritsch from power. At this stage of his career, Küchler was a General of Artillery and commander of the 1st Military District. This was a challenging post as it was located in East Prussia and largely surrounded by Poland. Much of his work was in improving the defences of the area but in March 1939, his troops marched into the Lithuanian city of Memel (now Klaipėda). (Note: Previously part of Imperial Germany, it was ceded to Lithuania after World War I. However, pressure from Nazi Germany saw the Lithuanian government cede the city.)

== World War II ==
=== Invasion of Poland ===
On the outbreak of World War II, Küchler's district headquarters was designated as the Wehrmacht's 3rd Army. He now controlled seven infantry divisions, the Panzer Division Kempf plus four commands of brigade size. During the invasion of Poland, some of Küchler's troops captured Danzig while the bulk of his forces advanced against the Polish Modlin Army. Having taken some ten thousand prisoners, Panzer Division Kempf was within fifty miles near Warsaw but, along with the rest of the 3rd Army, Kempf was diverted to the east of Poland. Küchler's forces defeated the Polish units in the area and then linked up with Soviet troops. At the conclusion of the Polish campaign, Küchler, still based in Poland, was designated commander of Army Frontier Command North.

Küchler refused to use his soldiers to persecute Jewish and Polish civilians, explaining to the Gauleiter of East Prussia Erich Koch that the "German army is not a supplier for a killer gang". This made Himmler furious and Küchler was removed from command. In November 1939, Commander in Chief of the Army Walther von Brauchitsch appointed Küchler commander of the 18th Army, then being organised in northern Germany. It comprised five infantry divisions, as well as a motorized division and the 9th Panzer Division, and was intended for operations against Holland.

=== Invasion of the Netherlands ===
On the morning of 10 May 1940, the German armed forces commenced the implementation of the Fall Gelb plan for the invasion of the Low Countries and France. The order for the invasion was issued by Army Commander-in-Chief Brauchitsch, without the attack being preceded by a declaration of war. The Luftwaffe started bombing Dutch airfields and other targets, with the city of Rotterdam in particular suffering a devastating assault that ended after four days with the old-city center entirely destroyed. The German ground forces entered the country as soon as the bombardments were concluded, led by paratrooper landings.

Küchler, fighting under General Fedor von Bock and commanding the 18th Army, engaged the Dutch ground forces at Moerdijk, Rotterdam, and the Hague. After several days of fighting in the country, after the German Luftwaffe destroyed Rotterdam and threatened to do the same to other major cities, on May 14, Dutch Army Commander-in-Chief General Henri Gerard Winkelman surrendered the armies north and east of the river Schelde, an area encompassing almost all of the Netherlands. Küchler, as the ranking German officer in the area, met the Dutch military delegation led by Winkelman at the village of Rijsoord and witnessed on behalf of the Wehrmacht the document of Dutch capitulation.

Küchler's troops then moved into the Kingdom of Belgium where they occupied Antwerp on 18 May 1940.

=== Invasion of the Soviet Union ===
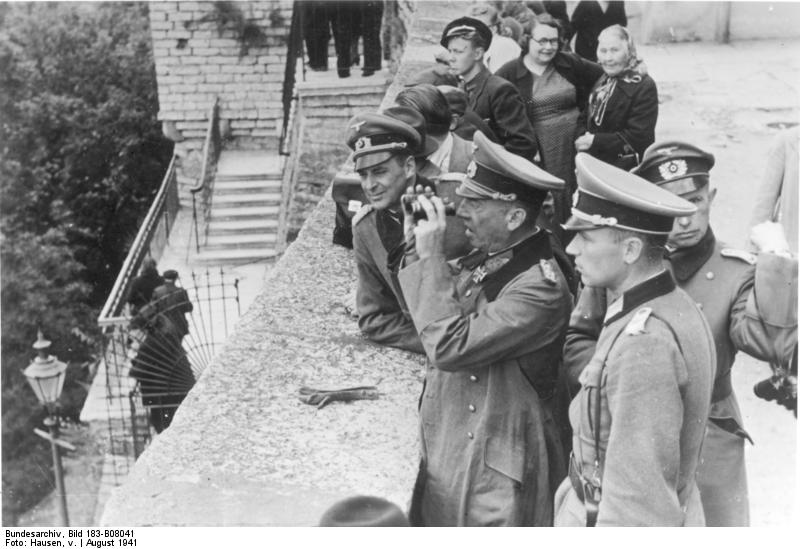
Küchler (middle, with binoculars) during a visit to Reval (Tallinn) after its capture, August 1941

In 1940 he was supportive of Nazi racial policy and ordered on 22 February a halt to any criticism of "ethnic struggle being carried out in the General Government, for instance, that of the Polish minorities, of the Jews and those regarding Church matters". His order explained that the "final ethnic solution" required unique and harsh measures.

Küchler was an active supporter of the planned war of annihilation (Vernichtungskrieg) against the Soviet Union. After meeting Hitler in March 1941 to plan for Operation Barbarossa, Küchler told his divisional commanders on 25 April 1941:

"We are separated from Russia, ideologically and racially, by a deep abyss. Russia is, if only by the mass of her territory, an Asian state...The Führer does not wish to palm off responsibility for Germany's existence on to a later generation; he has decided to force the dispute with Russia before the year is out. If Germany wishes to live in peace for generations, safe from a threatening danger in the East, this cannot be a case of pushing Russia back a little-or even hundreds of kilometers-but the aim must be to annihilate European Russia, to dissolve the Russian state in Europe".

Küchler went on to call Red Army commissars "criminals" who should all be shot.

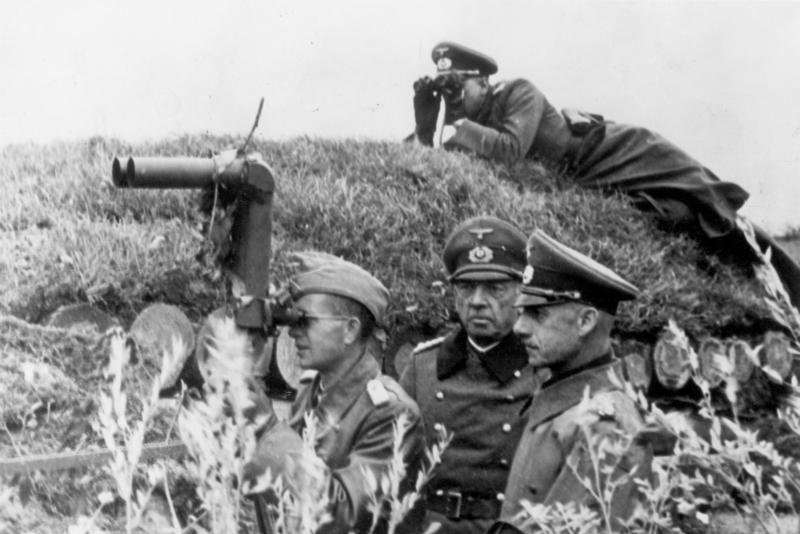
Field Marshal Leeb (right) with Küchler (middle) on an artillery observation post on the eastern front, October 1941

During Operation Barbarossa, the 18th Army forced its way to Ostrov and Pskov after the Soviet troops of the Northwestern Front retreated towards Leningrad. On 10 July 1941, both Ostrov and Pskov were captured and the 18th Army reached Narva and Kingisepp, from where advance toward Leningrad continued from the Luga River line. This had the effect of creating siege positions from the Gulf of Finland to Lake Ladoga, with the eventual aim of isolating Leningrad from all directions.

Küchler was directly involved in the murder of mentally disabled people in the occupied Soviet Union. In December 1941, with his express consent, units of the SD shot 240 mental patients in the Russian town of Makaryevo.

On 17 January 1942, Küchler succeeded Field Marshal Wilhelm Ritter von Leeb as commander of Army Group North after the latter was relieved of command. Küchler commanded Army Group North from December 1941 through January 1944, maintaining the siege of Leningrad. On 30 June 1942 Hitler promoted Küchler to Generalfeldmarschall.

Brought back to Hitler's headquarters on 31 January 1944, Küchler was relieved of his command and replaced by Generaloberst Model. Although Model stabilised the situation by March, this was only by withdrawing what was left of 18th Army to the west of Lake Peipus. Küchler in the meantime went into retirement. He declined an invitation from Carl Goerdeler and Johannes Popitz to join the anti-Hitler movement.

== Trial and conviction ==
At the end of World War II, Küchler was arrested by American occupation authorities. He was tried in the High Command Trial, as part of the Subsequent Nuremberg Trials. In his testimony regarding the crimes against the Soviet prisoners of war, Küchler admitted that the conditions in the POW camps were harsh, but insisted that the main cause of that was the winter conditions of 1941–42, which he called an "act of God" and insisted that the army exaggerated POW mortality in their reports in an effort to receive more supplies for the prisoners.

On 27 October 1948 Küchler was sentenced to twenty years' imprisonment for war crimes and crimes against humanity committed in the Soviet Union. His sentence was reviewed by the "Peck Panel" and reduced to 12 years in 1951. He was released in February 1953 and lived with his wife in the Garmisch region. He died in Garmisch-Partenkirchen on 25 May 1968.

== Awards ==
- Kingdom of Prussia:
  - Iron Cross 2nd Class (20 November 1914)
  - Iron Cross 1st Class (8 January 1915)
  - Royal House Order of Hohenzollern, Knight's Cross with Swords (11 July 1917)
  - Order of Saint John (Bailiwick of Brandenburg), Knight of Honor (Ehrenritter) (10 March 1917)
- Duchy of Anhalt: Friedrich Cross (1 June 1916)
- Free and Hanseatic City of Hamburg: Hanseatic Cross (6 August 1917)
- Grand Duchy of Hesse: General Honor Decoration for Bravery (5 January 1915)
- Kingdom of Württemberg: Friedrich Order, Knight 1st Class with Swords (August 1916)
- Weimar Republic: Baltic Cross (July 1919)
- Nazi Germany:
  - Honor Cross of the World War 1914/1918 for Combatants (15 January 1935)
  - Wehrmacht Long Service Award, 4th to 1st Classes (2 October 1936)
  - 1939 Clasp to the Iron Cross 2nd Class (11 September 1939)
  - 1939 Clasp to the Iron Cross 1st Class (22 September 1939)
  - Knight's Cross of the Iron Cross with Oak Leaves
    - Knight's Cross on 30 September 1939 as General der Artillerie and commander of the 3rd Army
    - 273rd Oak Leaves on 21 August 1943 as Generalfeldmarschall and commander of Army Group North
- Kingdom of Italy: Order of the Crown of Italy, Grand Cross (27 August 1940)

== Notes ==
Footnotes

Citations

Military offices
Preceded by none	Commander of 1st Infantry Division; 1 October 1934 – 1 April 1935	Succeeded by Generalleutnant Walther Schroth
Preceded by none	Commander of 3rd Army; 1 September 1939 – 5 November 1939	Succeeded by none
Preceded by none	Commander of 18th Army; 5 November 1939 – 16 January 1942	Succeeded by Generaloberst Georg Lindemann
Preceded by Generalfeldmarschall Wilhelm Ritter von Leeb	Commander of Army Group North; 17 January 1942 – 9 January 1944	Succeeded by Generalfeldmarschall Walter Model
