= 1st Independent Parachute Brigade =

1st Independent Parachute Brigade: 1. Samodzielna Brygada Spadochronowa (Polish)
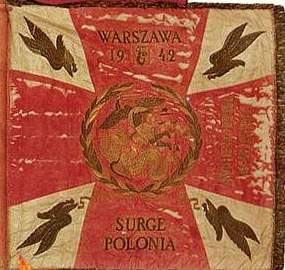
- Brigade standard
- Active: 23 September 1941 – 30 June 1947
- Country: Poland
- Allegiance: Polish government-in-exile
- Type: Airborne forces
- Role: Parachute infantry
- Size: Brigade
- Part of: Polish Armed Forces in the West
- Motto: "Najkrótszą drogą" (By The Shortest Way)
- Engagements: Operation Market Garden
- Battle honours: Order of William

Commanders
- Notable commanders: Gen. bryg. Stanisław Sosabowski

The 1st (Polish) Independent Parachute Brigade was a parachute infantry brigade of the Polish Armed Forces in the West under the command of Major General Stanisław Sosabowski, created in September 1941 during the Second World War and based in Scotland.

Originally, the brigade's exclusive mission was to drop into occupied Poland in order to help liberate the country. The British government, however, pressured the Poles into allowing the unit to be used in the Western theatre of war. Operation Market Garden eventually saw the unit sent into action in support of the British 1st Airborne Division at the Battle of Arnhem in September 1944. The first Poles were landed by glider from 18 September. Bad weather over England delayed the parachute section of the Brigade until 21 September, when it parachuted into Driel on the South bank of the Rhine. The Poles suffered significant casualties during the next few days of fighting, but still were able, by their presence, to cause about 2,500 German troops to be diverted to deal with them for fear of their supporting the remnants of the 1st Airborne trapped over the lower Rhine in Oosterbeek. Some of the Polish paratroopers, including Stanisław Kulik, managed to get across the Rhine to support the 1st Airborne, but when the retreat order came there were not enough boats to get everyone back across. The Dutch underground then helped shelter some of the paratroopers for around a month, until they could be rescued in Operation Pegasus.

== History ==
The Brigade was originally trained close to RAF Ringway and later in Upper Largo in Scotland. It was finally based in Lincolnshire, close to RAF Spitalgate (Grantham) where it continued training until its eventual departure for Europe after D-Day.

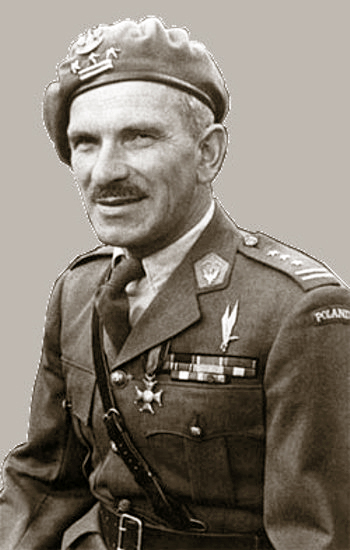
Stanisław Sosabowski, the brigade's commander

The Brigade was formed by the Polish High Command in exile with the aim of its being used to support the Polish resistance during the nationwide uprising, a plan that encountered opposition from the British, who argued that a single brigade would be of no use against the entire German army stationed in Occupied Poland. The pressure of the British government eventually caused the Poles to give in and agree to let the Brigade be used on the Western Front. On 6 June 1944 the unit, originally the only Polish unit directly subordinate to the Polish government-in-exile and thus independent of the British command, was transferred into the same command structure as all other Polish Forces in the West. It was allocated to take part in several operations after the invasion of Normandy, but all of them were cancelled. On 27 July, aware of the imminent Warsaw Uprising, the Polish government-in-exile asked the British government for air support, including dropping the Brigade in the vicinity of Warsaw. This request was refused on the grounds of the aircraft used by the Brigade did not have enough fuel to reach Warsaw, along with the request to use Soviet airfields being denied. Eventually, the Brigade entered combat when it was dropped during Operation Market Garden in September 1944.

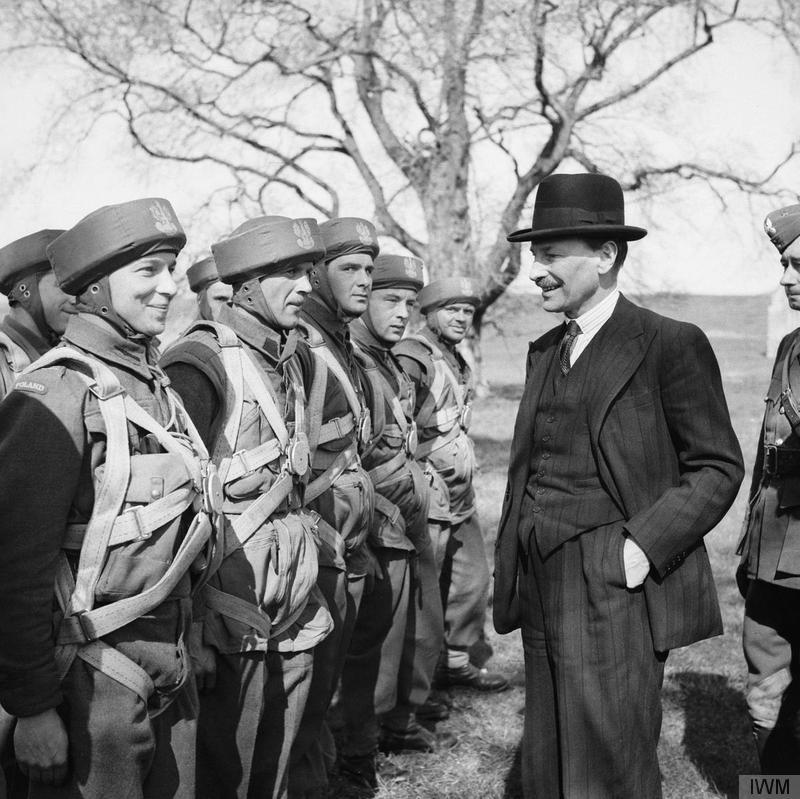
Clement Attlee visiting troops of the 1st Polish Independent Parachute Brigade at Cupar, 20 April 1942.

During the operation, the Brigade's anti-tank battery went into Arnhem on the third day of the battle (19 September), supporting the British paratroopers at Oosterbeek. This left Sosabowski with only PIATs as anti-tank capability. The light artillery battery was left behind in England due to a shortage of gliders. Owing to bad weather and a shortage of transport planes, the drop into Driel was delayed by two days, to 21 September. The British units which were supposed to cover the landing zone were in a bad situation and out of radio contact with the main Allied forces. Finally, the 2nd Battalion, and elements of the 3rd Battalion, with support troops from the Brigade's Medical Company, Engineer Company and HQ Company, were dropped under German fire east of Driel. They overran Driel, after it was realised that the Heveadorp ferry had been destroyed. In Driel, the Polish paratroopers set up a defensive "hedgehog" position, from which over the next two nights further attempts were made to cross the Rhine.

The following day, the Poles were able to produce some makeshift boats and attempt a crossing. With great difficulty and under German fire from the heights of Westerbouwing on the north bank of the river, the 8th Parachute Company and, later, additional troops from 3rd Battalion, managed to cross the Rhine in two attempts. In total, about 200 Polish paratroopers made it across in two days, and were able to cover the subsequent withdrawal of the remnants of the British 1st Airborne Division.

Not all of the paratroopers were able to withdraw back across the Rhine, due to the numbers involved and a shortage of boats. Those who were trapped on the German-controlled side were either captured by the Germans or, like Stanisław Kulik, were sheltered by the Dutch underground. They were hidden in various houses in the towns and villages, or in huts or makeshift dens in the woods, for about a month until they were rescued in Operation Pegasus on 22 October 1944.

On 26 September 1944, the members of the Brigade who were on the Allied side of the Rhine (now including the 1st Battalion and elements of the 3rd Battalion, who were parachuted near to Grave on 23 September) were ordered to march towards Nijmegen. The Brigade had lost 25% of its fighting strength, amounting to 590 casualties.

In 1945, the Brigade was attached to the Polish 1st Armoured Division and undertook occupation duties in Northern Germany until it was disbanded on 30 June 1947. The majority of its soldiers chose to stay in exile rather than hazard returning to the new communist Poland.

== Post-war honours ==
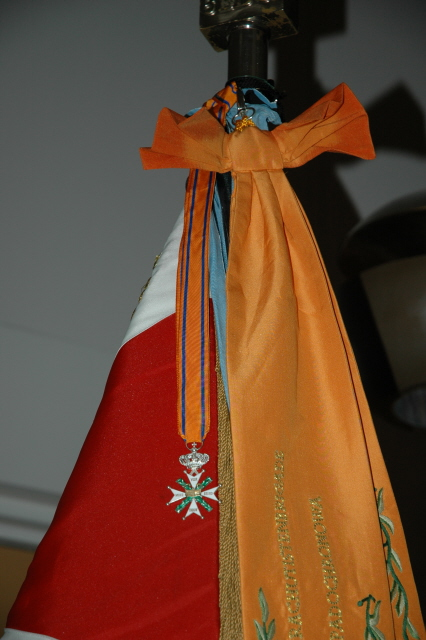
Military William Order awarded to the Polish 1st Independent Parachute Brigade

Shortly after the war, Queen Wilhelmina of the Netherlands wanted to honour the Parachute Brigade and wrote her government a request. However, the Minister of Foreign Affairs, Eelco van Kleffens, opposed the idea. He thought an award for the Poles would upset the relations with the 'Big Three' and harm national interests.

More than 61 years after World War II, the Brigade was awarded the Military Order of William on 31 May 2006 for its distinguished and outstanding acts of bravery, skill and devotion to duty during Operation Market Garden. The Military Order of William is the highest Dutch military award. Only eleven units have been awarded this honor, of which only two are non-Dutch. The award is now worn by the 6th Airborne Brigade which inherited the battle honours of the brigade.

== Brigade Order of Battle ==
- Brigade HQ CO: Maj. Gen S. Sosabowski
  - Deputy Brigade CO: Lt.Col. S. Jachnik
- 1st Parachute Battalion CO: Lt.Col. M. Tonn
  - 1st Parachute Company
  - 2nd Parachute Company
  - 3rd Parachute Company
- 2nd Parachute Battalion CO: Lt.Col. W. Ploszewski
  - 4th Parachute Company
  - 5th Parachute Company
  - 6th Parachute Company
- 3rd Parachute Battalion CO: Maj. W. Sobocinski
  - 7th Parachute Company
  - 8th Parachute Company
  - 9th Parachute Company
- Airborne Anti-tank Battery CO: Capt. J. Wardzala
- Airborne Engineer Company CO: Capt. P. Budziszewski
- Airborne Signals Company CO: Capt. J. Burzawa
- Airborne Medical Company CO: Lt. J. Mozdzierz
- Transport and Supply Company CO: Capt. A. Siudzinski
- Airborne Light Artillery Battery CO: Maj. J. Bielecki

== Portrayals ==
The brigade's participation in Market Garden was prominently featured in the book and film of A Bridge Too Far. General Sosabowski was portrayed by Gene Hackman.

A first-hand account of one of the Polish paratroopers in Market Garden, Stanisław Kulik, is described in the book From the Soviet Gulag to Arnhem: A Polish Paratrooper's Epic Wartime Journey. Stanisław had traveled from the Siberian gulag through Central Asia to the UK, where he had trained as a paratrooper. He was trapped behind enemy lines in Arnhem and the Dutch Underground helped him escape.

== See also ==
- Polish government-in-exile
- Cichociemni – "Silent Unseen", Polish special operations agents parachuted into occupied Poland
- Polish contribution to World War II
- Western betrayal
