= 20th Infantry Division (Poland) =

Polish Army formation

20th Infantry Division (Polish: 20. Dywizja Piechoty) was an infantry division of the Polish Army during the interbellum period, which took part in the Polish September Campaign. It was formed in 1920 from the reorganization of the 2nd Lithuanian-Belarusian Division, stationed in Baranavichy (Polish: Baranowicze) and commanded by Colonel Wilhelm Lawicz-Liszka.

== September 1939 Campaign ==
In the summer of 1939 it was moved west and became part of the Modlin Army. Its task was to defend the partly fortified area north of Mława, near the interwar border of Poland and East Prussia.

Between September 1 and 3, 1939 (see: September Campaign), the division defended positions around Mława in the Battle of Mława, facing the more numerous and better equipped units of the German I Army Corps (composed of: 11th Infantry Division, 61st Infantry Division and the Panzer Division Kempf).

The Wehrmacht was advancing southwards, towards Warsaw, but first attacks were repulsed with the loss of around 25 German tanks. Unable to capture Mława in frontal attack, the Germans decided to go around and attack from sides. As they threatened 20th I.D.'s rear, the Poles were ordered to withdraw. However, supported by the neighbouring Polish 8th Infantry Division, the defenders kept their positions.

On September 2, German attacks failed again, even though they ordered Polish civilians to walk in front of their tanks. The Germans decided to organize an offensive from the area of Ostrołęka and Przasnysz. This succeeded, and on September 3, Polish positions were broken. To make matters worse, the counter-attack of the 8th I.D. was ill-organized and failed, resulting in chaotic, panic withdrawal of 8th I.D. units.

Facing the difficult situation, the 20th I.D. was ordered to withdraw on the night of September 3–4. Bombed by the Germans, the division around September 7 reached the area of Płock. Then, the unit's remains entered Warsaw, helping with its defence from northwest. They capitulated together with the Warsaw garrison on September 28 (see: Siege of Warsaw (1939)).

The Germans who fought against the 20. at Mława gave it a nickname "Steel Division."

== Order of Battle (1939) ==
- Division Headquarters – based in Baranavichy (Polish: Baranowicze)
- 78th Infantry Regiment – based in Baranavichy
- 79th Infantry Regiment – based in Slonim (Polish: Słonim)
- 80th Infantry Regiment – based in Slonim
- 20th Light Artillery Regiment – based in Pruzhany (Polish: Prużany)

== See also ==
- Polish army order of battle in 1939
- Polish contribution to World War II
- List of Polish divisions in World War II
