= Wilhelm Lawicz-Liszka =

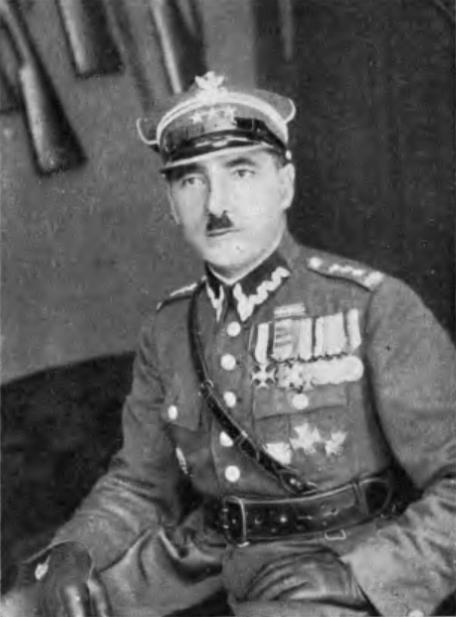
- Born: November 9, 1893; Kraków, Kingdom of Galicia and Lodomeria, Austria-Hungary
- Died: February 16, 1968 (aged 74); London, England, United Kingdom
- Military career
- Allegiance: Austria-Hungary; Poland
- Branch: Austro-Hungarian Army; Polish Armed Forces; Polish Armed Forces in the West
- Service years: 1914 – 1968
- Rank: Brigadier General
- Conflicts: World War I Polish–Soviet War; World War II: Battle of Mława; Siege of Warsaw

Wilhelm Lawicz-Liszka was a Polish infantry officer of the Polish Legions in World War I and the Blue Army, a colonel of the Polish Armed Forces and the Polish Armed Forces in the West. He fought for Polish independence in World War I and World War II and the Polish–Soviet War. In 1966 he was appointed brigadier general by the president of the Polish government-in-exile.

== Biography ==
From 1905 to 1912 he was a student of the Bartłomiej Nowodworski High School in Kraków. He attended one class with Antoni Staich. After graduating from high school, he began studies at the Faculty of Law and Administration of the Jagiellonian University. During his studies, he was active in the Polish Rifle Squads.

During World War I, from August 1914 to February 1918, he served in the Polish Legions and the Polish Auxiliary Corps. He was an officer of the 2nd Infantry Regiment, in which he commanded a platoon until 17 April 1915 and a company, and commandant of a regimental NCO school. Until May 1918, he commanded a battalion in the Polish II Corps in Russia, and then, until August that year, in conspiracy, he conducted an agitation and recruitment campaign in Ukraine. Later, until December 1918, he commanded a company and an officer school in the 4th Rifle Division in the Kuban. In December 1918, he came to Poland as part of the military mission of General Żeligowski to Chief of State.

In February 1919, he took command of the battalion in the 2nd Foot Rifle Regiment, which on September 1, 1919, after the unification of the Blue Army with the Polish Armed Forces, was renamed the 44th Borderlands Rifle Regiment. In December 1920 he became the commander of this unit. He was also the commander of the XXV Infantry Brigade.

In the years 1921–1922 he was a student of the Training Course at the Wyższa Szkoła Wojenna in Warsaw. In October 1922, after completing the course and obtaining a scientific diploma of an officer of the General Staff, he was assigned to the Command of the 16th Infantry Division in Grudziądz as the chief of staff. In the period from January to September 1924, he was the deputy chief of staff of the Corps District No. V in Kraków and the Corps District No. VII in Poznań. In September 1924 he was transferred to Division IV of the General Staff in Warsaw. In March 1927 he took command of the 52nd Borderland Infantry Regiment in Złoczów. In November 1929 he was appointed head of the Military Department in the Ministry of Communications. In December 1930 he became the commander of the infantry division of the 25th Infantry Division in Kalisz. After four years, in November 1934 he was transferred to the position of the assistant commander of the Corps District No. X in Przemyśl. In May 1936 he was elected vice-president of the board of the District Society of Friends of the Riflemen's Association in Przemyśl. On 2 April 1938, he was appointed commander of the 20th Infantry Division in Baranowicze. In the third decade of March 1939, the division he commanded was mobilized and transported to the operational region of the Army "Modlin". He commanded the division in the Invasion of Poland on 1–4 September in the Battle of Mława, and then in the Siege of Warsaw. On 29 September 1939, Maj. Gen. Juliusz Rómmel " in recognition of his merits, for his bravery, he awarded" him with the Gold Cross of the Military Order of Virtuti Militari, and in the farewell order for the 20 DP, he stated, inter alia, "the actions of this borderland division will go down in history as a model of fulfilling their duty".

He became a military settler in the Szubków colony (Hallerowo settlement, Tuczyn commune).

From October 1939 to April 1945 he was in German captivity. He was a prisoner of the Oflag VII-A Murnau. After his release from captivity, he was admitted to the 2nd Polish Corps in Italy and assigned to the 7th Infantry Division. After the corps was moved to England and demobilized, he settled in London.

The President of the Republic of Poland, August Zaleski, appointed him brigadier general with seniority on 11 November 1966, in the corps of generals.

He died on 16 February 1968 in London. After his death, the corpse was incinerated. In June 1968 the ashes were transported to Poland and buried at the Powązki Military Cemetery in Warsaw (section B II 24-6-10).

On 1 September 1985, a stamp with a face value of 10 zlotys was put into circulation, showing a portrait of Col. Dipl. Andrzej Liszka-Lawicz and the defense of Mława.

== Awards ==
- Virtuti Militari, Gold Cross
- Virtuti Militari, Silver Cross (1921)
- Cross of Independence
- Order of Polonia Restituta
- Cross of Valour
- Commemorative Medal for the War of 1918–1921
- Medal of the Decade of Regained Independence
- Interallied Victory Medal

=== Foreign Awards ===
- France: 1914–1918 Commemorative war medal

== Bibliography ==
- Kryska-Karski, Tadeusz; Żurakowski, Stanisław (1991). Generals of independent Poland. Warsaw: Editions Spotkania.
- Strzałkowski Waldemar, "Wilhelm Andrzej Lawicz-Liszka", [in:] Jurga Tadeusz, "Defense of Poland 1939", PAX Publishing Institute, Warsaw 1990, publ. I, ISBN 83-211-1096-7, p. 792.
- H P kosk Polish Generalicja vol. 1 edition: Oficyna Wydawnicza "Ajaks" Pruszków 1998.
- Marian Koral, "Chronicle. Review of the events from January 1 to March 31, 1968", Military Historical Review No. 2 (46), Warsaw 1968.
