= Krzynowłoga Mała =

- Village
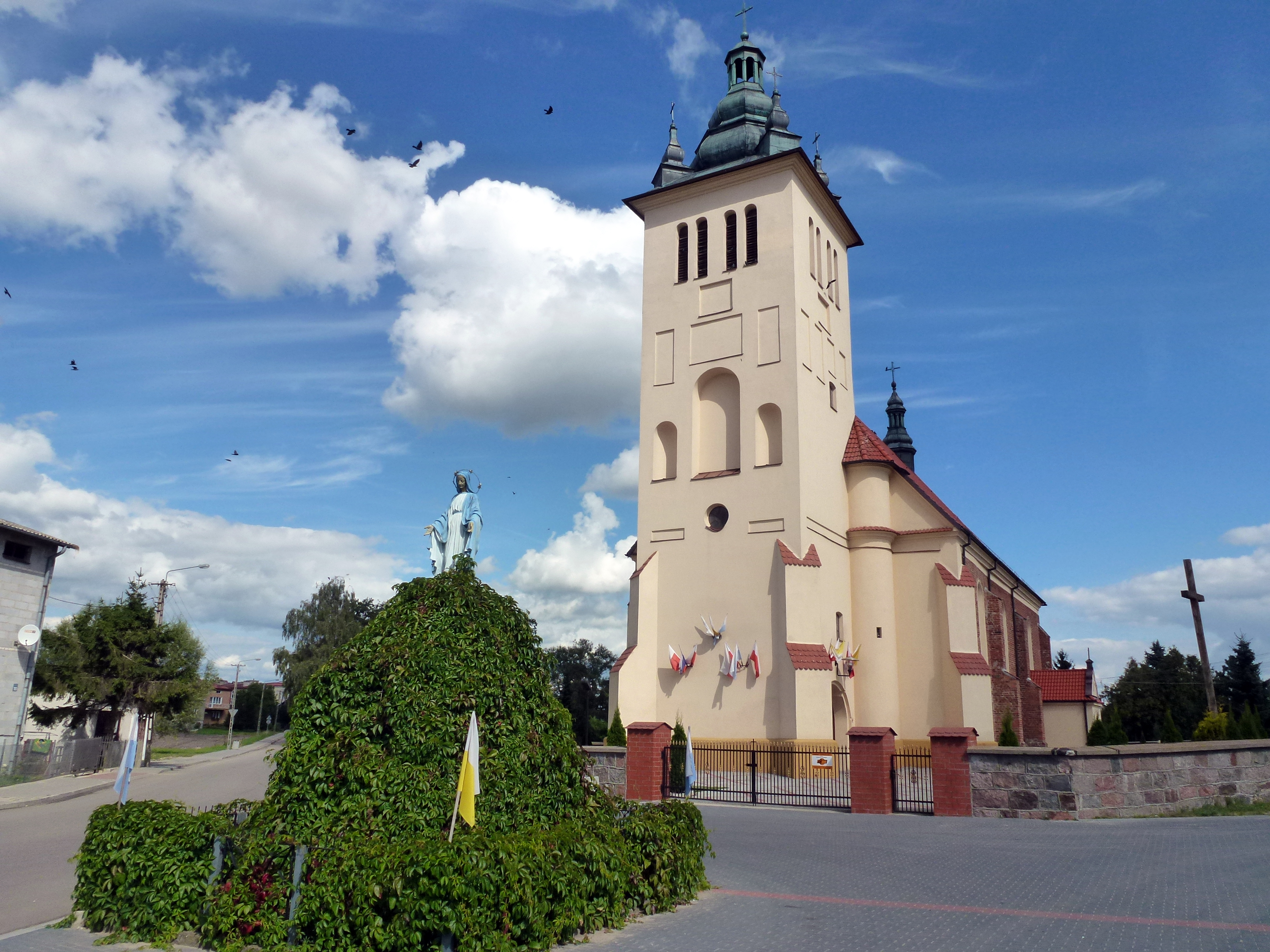
- St. Dominic church

- Location within Poland
- Coordinates: 53°10′N 20°48′E
- Country: Poland
- Voivodeship: Masovian
- County: Przasnysz
- Gmina: Krzynowłoga Mała
- Population: 520

Krzynowłoga Mała [kʂɨnɔˈvwɔɡa ˈmawa] is a former town, now a village in Przasnysz County, Masovian Voivodeship, in east-central Poland. It is the seat of the gmina (administrative district) called Gmina Krzynowłoga Mała.
