= Emil Krukowicz-Przedrzymirski =

Polish general

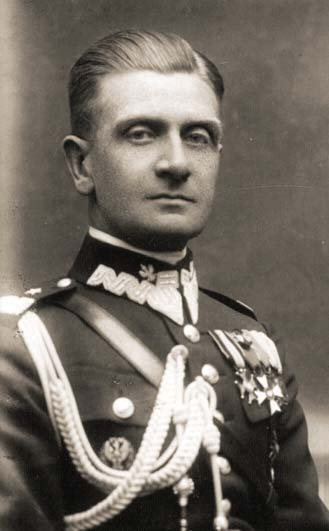
- Born: January 25, 1886
- Died: May 25, 1957 (aged 71); Toronto, Canada
- Relatives: Henryk Krukowicz-Przedrzymirski (brother)
- Military career
- Allegiance: Austria-Hungary; Poland
- Rank: General
- Commands: Modlin Army
- Conflicts: First World War; Polish–Soviet War; Second World War

Emil Krukowicz-Przedrzymirski also known as Emil Karol Przedrzymirski de Krukowicz (1886-1957) was a Polish general. Krukowicz-Przedrzymirski was born in 1886. He began military service as an artillery officer in the Austro-Hungarian Army during World War I. He joined the Polish Army in 1918 and fought in the Polish Soviet War. During the war, Krukowicz-Przedrzymirski received the Virtuti Militari medal for valor. He was promoted to general in 1931. He served as the commander of the Army Modlin during the Invasion of Poland in 1939. He was captured by German troops and spent the rest of World War II as a prisoner. After being liberated by the Western Allies at the end of the war, he remained in emigration for the rest of his life (first in Great Britain, later in Canada). He died in 1957.

== Personal life ==
His brother was Henryk Krukowicz-Przedrzymirski, an artillery officer like Emil and a figure skater.

== Honours and awards ==
- Silver Cross of the Virtuti Militari
- Officer's Cross of the Order of Polonia Restituta
- Gold Cross of Merit
- Commemorative Medal for War 1918-1921
- Regained Independence Medal of the Decade
- Silver Medal for Long Service
- Gold Badge of Honour Polish Combatants Association
- Commander's Cross of the Order of the Star of Romania
- Commander's Cross with Star of the Order of Merit of the Republic of Hungary
