= Modlin Army =

Polish army; took part in the defence of Poland in 1939

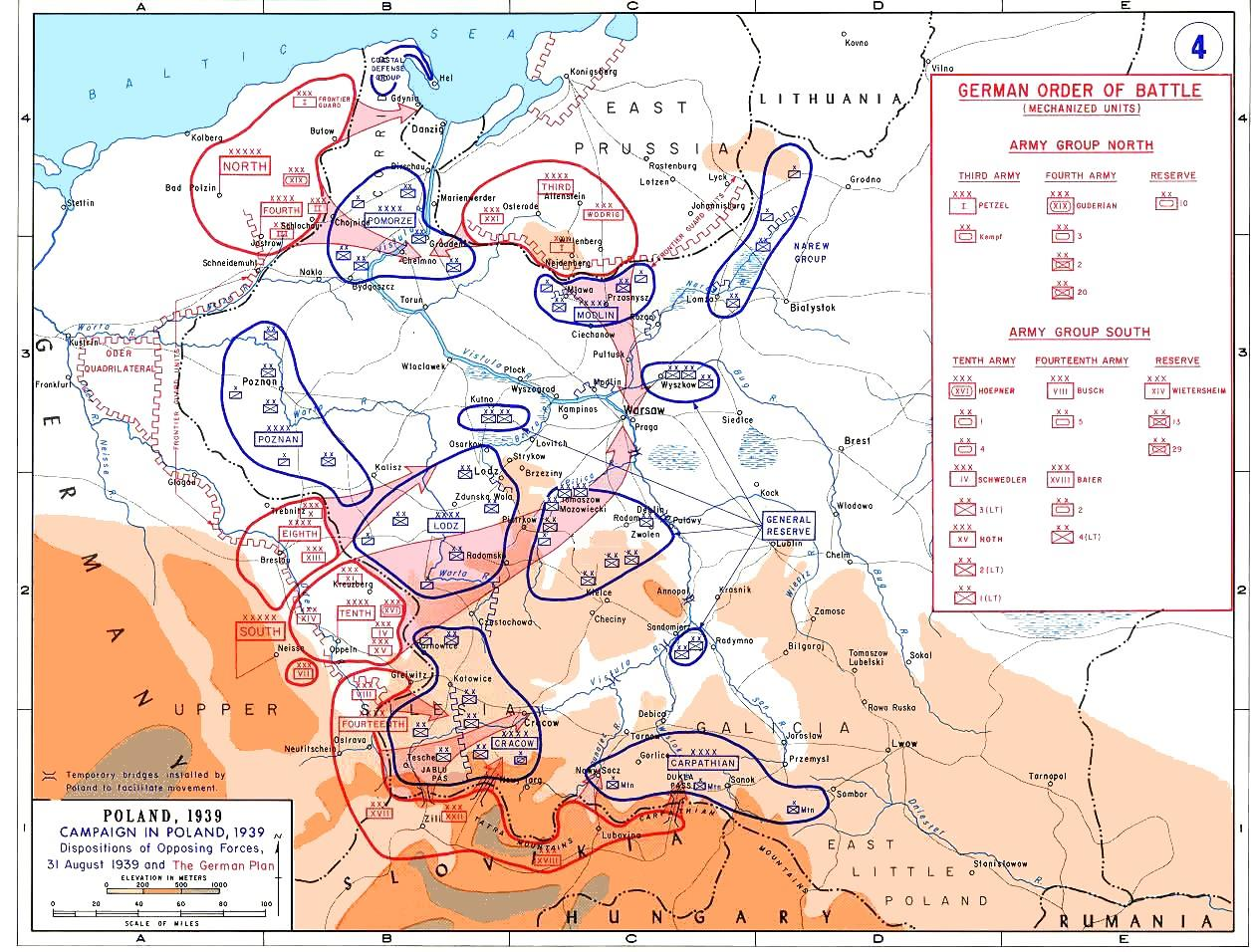
Dispositions of opposing forces, August 31, 1939, and the German plan of operation. Modlin army visible in the top central of the map.

Modlin Army (Polish: Armia Modlin) was one of the Polish armies that were part of the Polish defense against the German Invasion of Poland. After heavy casualties in the battle of Mława (September 1–3), the Army was forced to abandon its positions near Warsaw around September 10; eventually it took part in the battle of Tomaszów Lubelski (September 21–26) and surrendered afterwards.

== Tasks ==
Named after Fort Modlin (where its initial headquarters were located), it was officially created on March 23, 1939 with the task of defending the Polish capital of Warsaw and the city of Płock from the north. It took positions near the fortified lines along the border with East Prussia near Mława, and was supposed to retreat in an organized fashion towards the second line of defense towards the Narew and Vistula rivers.

== Operational history ==
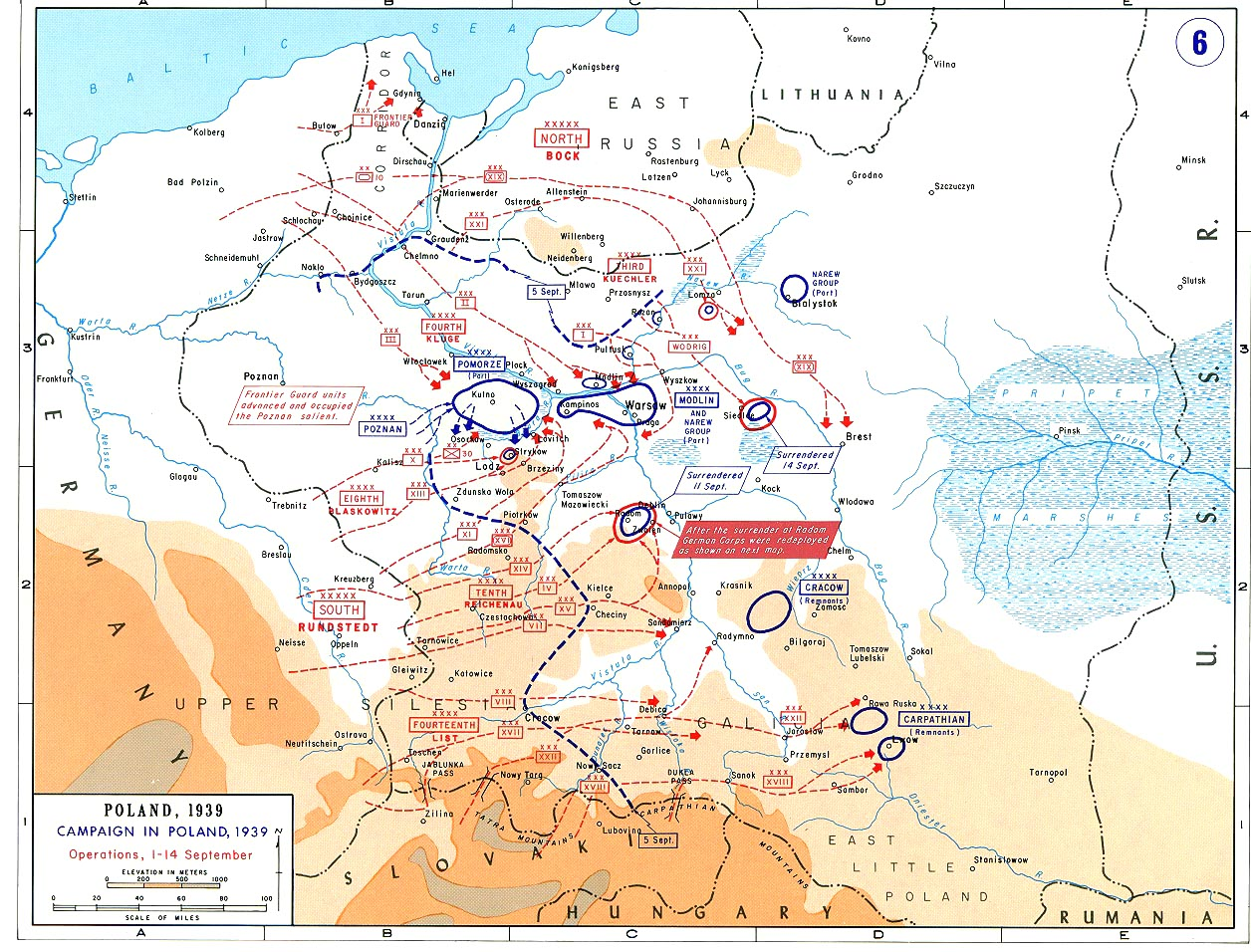
Dispositions of opposing forces, September 14, 1939. Modlin army visible in the center of the map.

When the Germans invaded on September 1, not all of the planned fortifications had been completed; some of the Army's units (such as the Mazowiecka Cavalry Brigade) had arrived in their designated areas only by 30 August (and its area had only 3 out of 40 planned fortifications completed).

During the Battle of the Border (particularly the battle of Mława on September 1–3) the Army was pushed back by the German Third Army, towards the Narew and Bug rivers. It received reinforcements in the form of the Operational Group Wyszków under General Wincenty Kowalski, but they were not sufficient to stop it from having to fall back. Eventually, around September 10, the Army abandoned its positions near Warsaw; some of the units (primarily the 20th Infantry Division) remained in the Warsaw area, joining the Warszawa Army taking part in the final defense of Warsaw; others were pushed to the south east (Romanian Bridgehead) and took part in the Battle of Tomaszów Lubelski (September 21–26), after which most of them were forced to surrender.

== Organization ==
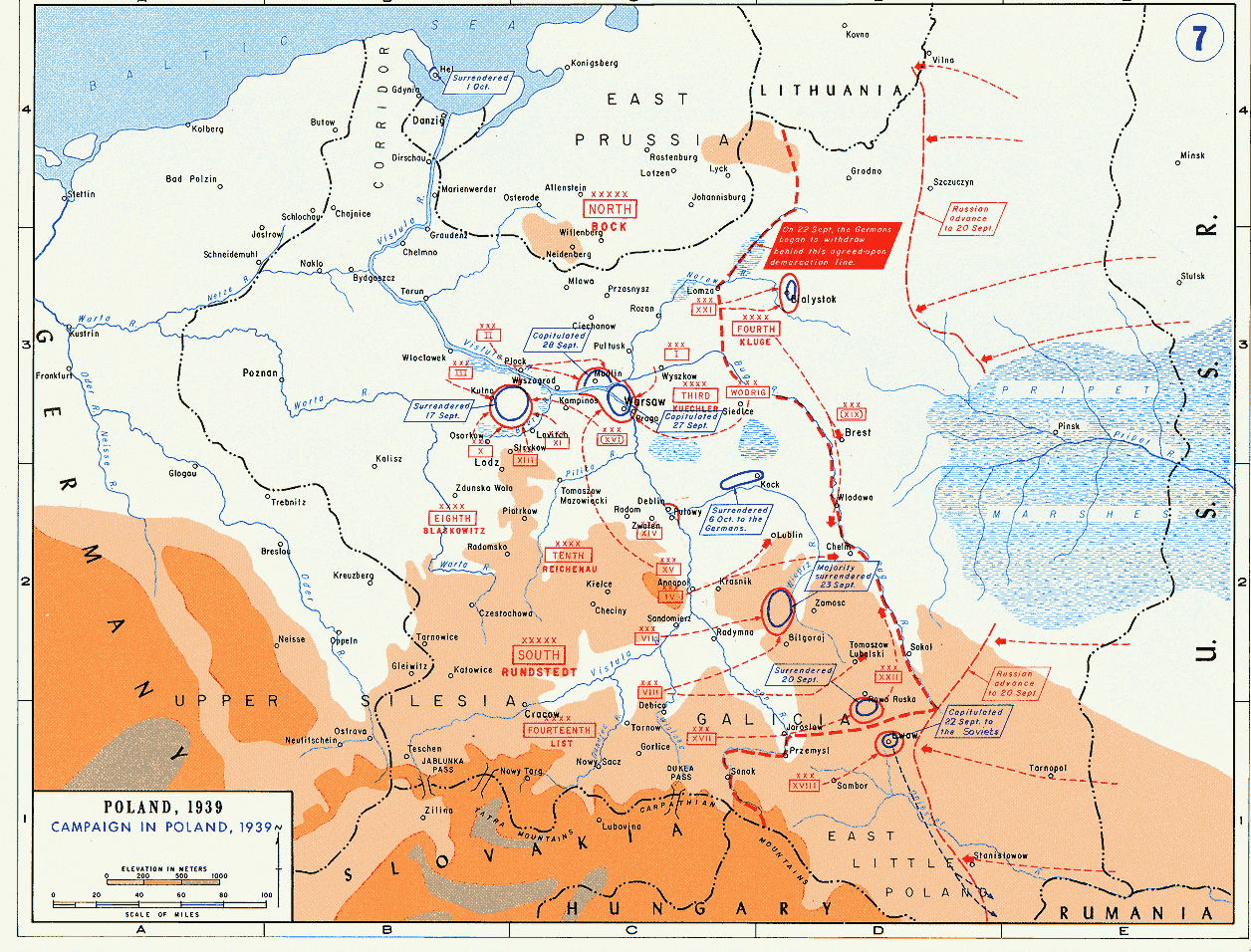
Forces after 14 September with troop movements after this date

The army was commanded by brig. gen. Emil Krukowicz-Przedrzymirski; his chief of staff was col. Stanisław Grodzki. It consisted of 2 infantry divisions and 2 cavalry brigades. On a lower level of organization it had 28 infantry battalions, 37 cavalry squadrons, 180 artillery pieces, 12 anti-air artillery pieces, 1 armored train (nr 13, former "Generał Sosnkowski") and 28 planes.

- 8th Infantry Division (8 Dywizja Piechoty) from Modlin
- 20th Infantry Division (20 Dywizja Piechoty) from Baranowicze
- Nowogródzka Cavalry Brigade (Nowogródzka Brygada Kawalerii)
- Mazowiecka Cavalry Brigade (Mazowiecka Brygada Kawalerii)
- Warsaw National Defence Brigade (Warszawska Brygada Obrony Narodowej)

=== Aviation of the Modlin Army ===
- (Pluton łącznikowy nr 11)
- (41. Eskadra Rozpoznawcza)
- (III/5. Dywizjon Myśliwski)
  - Polish 152nd Fighter Escadrille (152. Eskadra Myśliwska)
- Polish 53rd Observation Escadrille (53. Eskadra Obserwacyjna)
