= Masovian Cavalry Brigade =

The Masovian Cavalry Brigade (Polish: Mazowiecka Brygada Kawalerii) was a cavalry unit of the Polish Army in the interbellum period, which took part in the Polish September Campaign. It was created on April 1, 1937, out of the former 1st Cavalry Brigade. Its headquarters were in Warsaw, with other units stationed in towns around the capital:

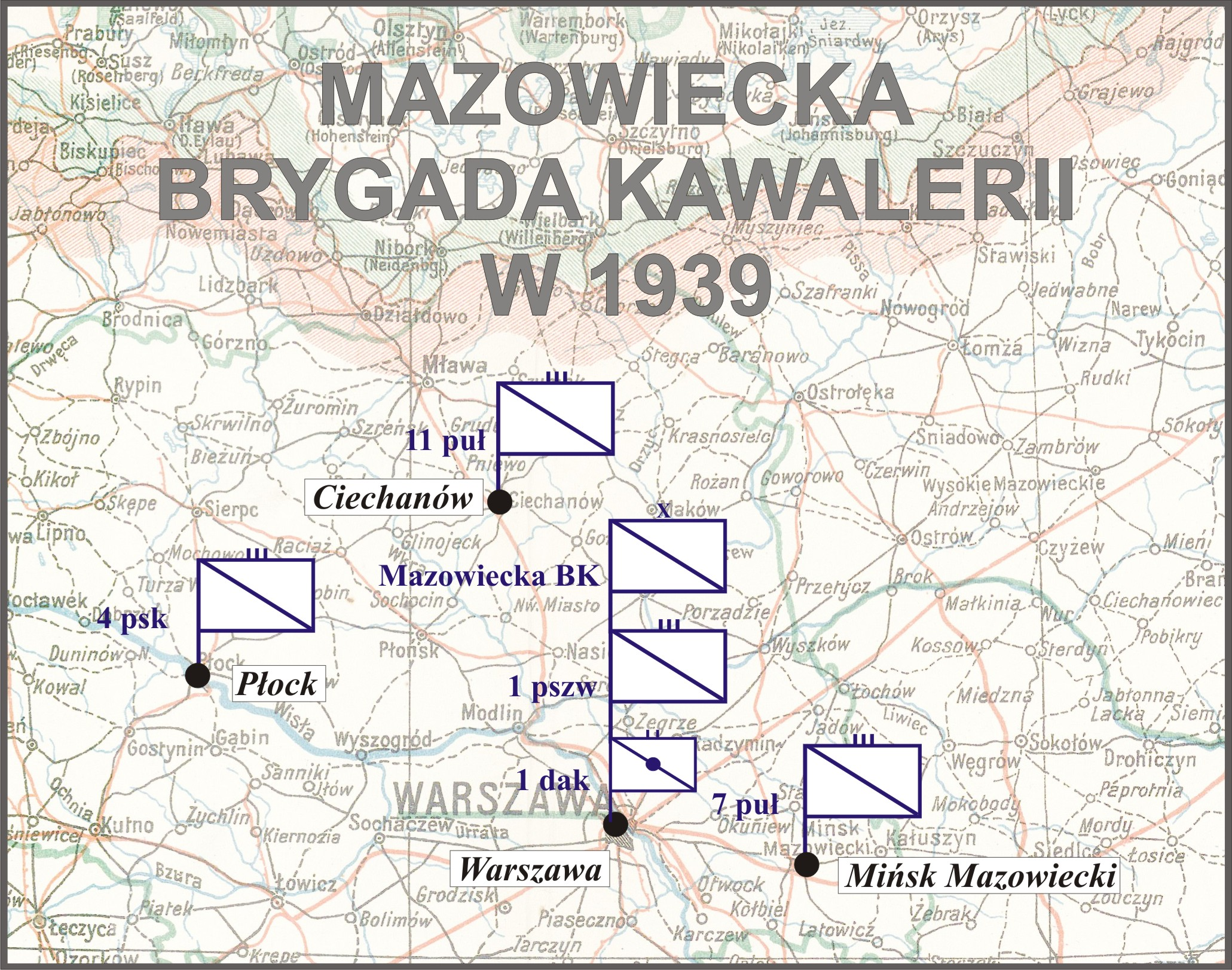
Masovian Cavalry Brigade w 1938

- 1st Józef Piłsudski Chevau-légers Regiment, garrisoned in Warsaw,
- 7th Lublin Uhlan Regiment, stationed in Mińsk Mazowiecki,
- 11th Legions Uhlan Regiment of Marshal Edward Smigly-Rydz, stationed in Ciechanów,
- 4th Łęczyca Mounted Rifles Regiment, stationed in Płock,
- 1st General Józef Bem Mounted Artillery Regiment, stationed in Warsaw,
- 1st Squadron of Pioneers, stationed in Warsaw,
- 1st Squadron of Communication, stationed in Warsaw,

== Polish September Campaign ==
The Brigade, under Colonel Jan Karcz, was part of the Modlin Army. On September 1, 1939, it defended positions around Mława, on the right wing of Polish lines. Facing the Poles was German 12th I.D, under Colonel Ludwig von Leyen. Facing encirclement, the Brigade had to withdraw to the second line of defence, on the night of September 1/2. In the morning of September 2, the Wehrmacht began a frontal attack and after several hours of heavy fights the Germans captured important Hill 190,5. The Poles tried to retake it, but their attacks failed. Later on, the Brigade retreated again, to the area of Przasnysz. This manoeuver opened right wing of the neighboring Polish 20th Infantry Division and on September 3, the Germans broke the lines. The Brigade was attacked by Armored Division "Kempf", under General Werner Kempf, as well as German 1st Cavalry Brigade under Colonel Kurt Feldt. Soon afterwards the Poles, under pressure from the enemy, abandoned their positions.

On September 4, 1939, the Brigade withdrew towards Pułtusk. On that day it was absorbed by the Polish 5th Infantry Division under General Juliusz Zulauf, and ordered to defend the line of the Narew river.

On September 7, the Brigade was ordered to withdraw across the Bug River, but for unknown reasons it changed order and moved to Wyszków, positioning itself on the line from Wyszków to Serock. Then it withdrew to Kałuszyn and Mińsk Mazowiecki, fighting the advancing German 11th I.D. of General Max Bock. In mid-September it covered activities of the 1st Legions Infantry Division. During the several skirmishes, the Brigade suffered heavy losses. It capitulated on September 26, 1939.

== See also ==
- Polish army order of battle in 1939
- Polish contribution to World War II
- Polish cavalry
