= 3rd Army (Wehrmacht) =

- German: 3. Armee
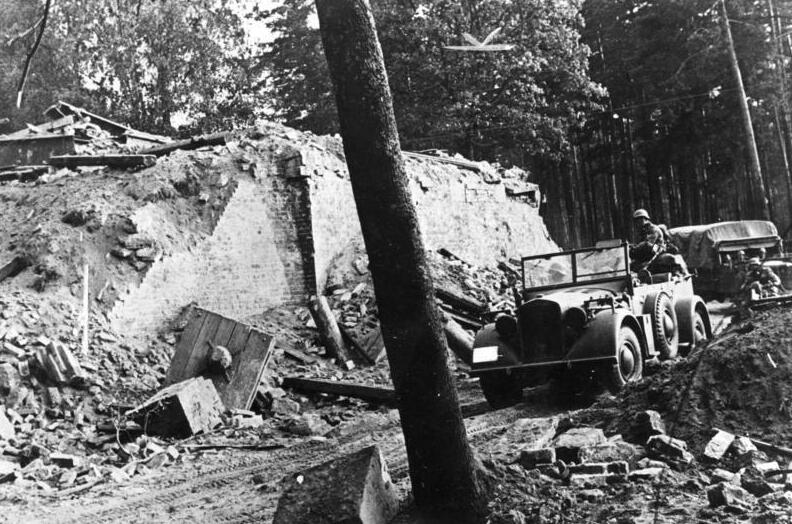
- The motorized troops of the Wehrmacht advancing past the remains of the bridge railway overpass at Tarnowit shortly after its demolition.
- Active: 1939
- Country: Nazi Germany
- Branch: German army ( Wehrmacht)
- Type: Field army
- Engagements: World War II: Polish Campaign

The 3rd Army (German: 3. Armee) was a German field army that fought during World War II.

== Combat chronicle ==
The 3rd Army was activated on September 1, 1939, the day German forces invaded Poland. It was put under the command of General der Artillerie Georg von Küchler. Küchler later became commander of Army Group North in 1942 and also later became Generalfeldmarschall. At the start of the Polish Campaign the 3rd Army was part of Generaloberst Feodor von Bock's Army Group North, together with Generaloberst Günther von Kluge's 4th Army. The 4th Army was to capture the Polish Corridor and enter East Prussia, thus re-linking the two areas. The Third Army was to split into two and attack from East Prussia. One part of the 3rd Army was to advance southwards into Modlin, cross near the confluence of the Vistula and Bug rivers and take part in the attack on Warsaw. The other part of the 3rd Army was to attack near Narew, attack along the Bug River, and make a drive into Brest-Litovsk.

When the attack on Poland was launched, a part of the 3rd Army moved toward the Polish Corridor and met with Kluge's 4th Army. Both the 3rd and 4th Armies implemented their plans well, and the Polish Campaign ended in victorious triumph for the German Army. The Red Army had attacked Poland from the east with a million men and advanced westwards to meet with the German troops, despite casualties that numbered more than expected. In Brest-Litovsk, a joint German and Soviet victory parade was held.

On November 5, 1939, only about five weeks following the end of the Polish Campaign, the Third Army was disbanded. The Third Army became one of the first German armies of World War II to be disbanded. The staff was moved to Bad Bertrich as 16th Army for use in the west. Immediately after the Third Army was disbanded Küchler became commander of the newly formed 18th Army and led it during the Western Campaign of 1940. He stayed in that position until 1942, when he became commander of Army Group North to lead the Siege on Leningrad. That year he became generalfeldmarschall but was replaced in 1944 following the Soviet breakthrough against Army Group North.

== Commanders ==
No.	Portrait	Commander	Took office	Left office	Time in office
1	Georg von Küchler	General der Artillerie; Georg von Küchler (1881–1968)	1 September 1939	5 November 1939	65 days
