= Kalki (disambiguation) =

Kalki is an avatar of Vishnu in Hinduism.

Kalki may also refer to:

== People ==
- Kalki Koechlin (born 1984), French actress
- Kalki Krishnamurthy (1899–1954), Indian writer
- Kalki Sadasivam (1902–1997), Indian activist, entertainer, and writer

== Places ==
- Kalki, Maharashtra, a village in Maharashtra, India

== Books, novels and magazines ==
- Kalki (magazine), a Tamil magazine of news and literature, published in India since 1941
- Kalki (novel), a 1978 Gore Vidal novel

== Film and television ==
- Kalki (1984 film), an Indian Malayalam language film directed by N. Sankaran Nair
- Kalki (1996 film), an Indian Tamil language film directed by K. Balachander
- Kalki (2017 film), an Indian Tamil-language short film
- Kalki (2019 Malayalam film), an Indian Malayalam-language film
- Kalki (2019 Telugu film), an Indian Telugu-language film
- Kalki 2898 AD, formerly Project Kalki, a 2024 Indian sci-fi by Nag Ashwin
- Kalki (TV series), an Indian Tamil-language soap opera, on air 2004–2006

== Other uses ==
- Elachista kalki, a moth of the family Elachistidae
- Playa Kalki, a beach on the Caribbean island of Curaçao
- Project Kalki, a limited Indian comic book series published by Virgin Comics in 2008

== See also ==
- Kalaki (disambiguation)
- Kałki (disambiguation), for places in Poland
