= Battle of Sarnowa Góra =

1920 battle

Battle of Sarnowa Gora
- Part of Polish–Soviet War
Date	14th – 19th August 1920
Location	Sarnowa Gora, Masovia
Result	Polish victory

Belligerents
Second Polish Republic	Russian SFSR

Commanders and leaders
Władysław Sikorski	August Kork

Casualties and losses
910 killed and wounded, 4 guns	500 POWs, rest of casualties unknown

The Battle of Sarnowa Góra took place on 14th–19th August 1920, during the Polish–Soviet War. Operational Group of the Polish Army, consisting of 42nd and 145th Infantry Regiments (part of 18th Infantry Division), four batteries of 18th Field Artillery Regiment and 8th Cavalry Brigade clashed with 4th and 33rd Rifle Divisions of the Red Army. The battle took place south of Ciechanów, near the village of Sarnowa Góra, located along rail line from Ciechanów to Nasielsk. Polish forces were commanded by General Franciszek Krajowski.

On 14 August 1920, units of Polish Fifth Army (General Władysław Sikorski) began crossing the Wkra river, assaulting Soviet 15th Army of General August Kork. Operational Group of General Krajowski attacked the enemy in its weakest point: the gap between Soviet 4th and 15th Armies. Krajowski, who was at first unaware of this situation, decided to take advantage of it, and turned his forces towards Glinojeck, to hit the wing of the 15th Army.

During the night of 14–15 August, after hand-to-hand combat, the Poles seized Sochocin. On 15 August three Soviet rifle divisions (4th, 11th and 16th) attacked Polish positions along the Wkra river. At the same time, Polish 8th Cavalry Brigade captured Ciechanów in a surprising raid.

On the night of 15–16 August, Polish 42nd Infantry Regiment captured Sarnowa Góra. Polish activities were noticed by General Kork, who sent his 33rd Rifle Division towards Ciechanów, ordering it to recapture the town and then continue its advance towards Płońsk, together with 4th and 16th Rifle Divisions. Soviet units advanced, forcing the Poles into retreat, and threatening the flank of Polish 18th Infantry Division. General Krajowski decided to send reinforcements to Sarnowa Góra, and after bloody fighting, the enemy was pushed north.

On the night of 16–17 August, Polish 144th Infantry Regiment, together with 8th Cavalry Brigade reinforced Polish frontline north of Ojrzeń. With these forces, General Krajowski planned to attack the left flank of Soviet 54th Rifle Division, which was part of 4th Army (General Aleksandr Shuvayev). The Russians forestalled the Poles, and attacked both Ojrzeń and Sarnowa Góra. Despite initial Soviet successes, Poles kept their positions.

In the evening of 17 August, Polish units regrouped. On the next day, Soviet 33rd Rifle Division once again tried to capture Sarnowa Góra and Ojrzeń, in order to open the road towards Płońsk. After artillery barrage, Soviet infantry entered the battle, but failed to push back the Poles. On the night of 18–19 August, Soviet armies began their retreat.

Soviet losses are unknown, while some Polish units, such as 145th Infantry Regiment, lost 50% of their manpower.

The Battle of Sarnowa Góra is commemorated on the Tomb of the Unknown Soldier, Warsaw, with the inscription "SARNOWA GÓRA pod CIECHANOWEM 16 - 20 VIII 1920".

== Sources ==
- Janusz Odziemkowski, Leksykon wojny polsko-rosyjskiej 1919 - 1920, wyd. RYTM Warszawa 2004. ISBN 83-7399-096-8.
- Otton Laskowski: Encyklopeda wojskowa. T. VII. Warszawa: Wydawnictwo Towarzystwa Wiedzy Wojskowej i Wojskowego Instytutu Naukowo-Wydawniczego, 1937.
