= Gołymin-Ośrodek =

- Village
- Saint John the Baptist church in Gołymin-Ośrodek

- Location within Poland
- Coordinates: 52°48′29″N 20°52′18″E
- Country: Poland
- Voivodeship: Masovian
- County: Ciechanów
- Gmina: Gołymin-Ośrodek

Population
  - Total: 700
- Time zone: UTC+1 (CET)
  - Summer (DST): UTC+2 (CEST)
- Vehicle registration: WCI

Gołymin-Ośrodek [ɡɔˈwɨmin ɔˈɕrɔdɛk] is a village in Ciechanów County, Masovian Voivodeship, in north-central Poland. It is the seat of the gmina (administrative district) called Gmina Gołymin-Ośrodek.

21 Polish citizens were murdered by Nazi Germany in the village during World War II.

== See also ==
- Gołymin
- Battle of Gołymin
- Gołymin-Północ ("Gołymin North", a separate sołectwo)
- Gołymin-Południe ("Gołymin South", a separate sołectwo)
