= Łysakowo =

Łysakowo may refer to the following places:

- Łysakowo, Ciechanów County in Masovian Voivodeship (north-central Poland)
- Łysakowo, Sierpc County in Masovian Voivodeship (north-central Poland)
- Łysakowo, Warmian-Masurian Voivodeship (north Poland)
