= Simón Bajour =

Polish-Argentine violinist (1928–2005)

Simón Bajour also Szymsia Bajour (born Szymon Bachórz; 4 April 1928, Nasierowo Górne or Nasielsk, Poland – 8 February 2005, Buenos Aires, Argentina) was a Jewish Polish-Argentine violinist who was known for both his popular and classical repertoires.

== Biography ==
His father Szmuel (died 10 October 1951) sent Szymon as a child to the Fryderyk Chopin University of Music in Warsaw where he studied under Wilhelm Krysztal. He left with his parents in 1937 for Argentina where his father had previously lived and been naturalized, and Szymsia later studied under David Oistrakh in Moscow in 1963 and previously with Ljerko Spiller in Buenos Aires.

Bajour was an original member of the first Quinteto of Astor Piazzolla together with Jaime Gosis, Kicho Díaz and Horacio Malvicino recording the first recording of the song Adiós Nonino. He was the first violin for Los Solistas de Buenos Aires and also played in the tango orchestra of Osvaldo Pugliese, Carlos Di Sarli, Atilio Stampone, Leopoldo Federico and Miguel Caló.

Bajour began in the Argentine Orquesta Sinfónica Nacional served as first violin for the permanent orchestra of the Teatro Colón. He worked in the Orquesta Sinfónica de La Habana between 1961–67 and later with the Orquesta de Jóvenes Músicos de la Argentina, the Universidad de San Juan, the Filarmónica de las Américas, the Sinfónica del Estado de México and the orchestra of the Universidad Nacional de Veracruz where he was exiled from 1976–1980.

Between 1983–1992 he was a part of the chamber duo Bajour-Antognazzi, interpreting the complete cycle of the Sonatas by Beethoven for violín and piano.

He served as musical instructor for violinists such as Daniel Zisman, Alejandro Rutkauskas, Pablo Agri, Pablo Saraví and Luis Favero, and violist Guillermo Anad.

In 2009, he was awarded the Premio Konex posthumously.

He was one of a group of prominent Jewish tango musicians, including Julio Jorge Nelson, Carlos Aguirre, Raúl Kaplún and Ismael Spitalnik.

== Family ==
In 1950, he was married to María Teresa Duro "Totona", with whom he had two children, Cecilia and then Claudio. He also had two children — Leo and Zully — from a previous marriage.

== Sources ==
- Julio Nudler Tango judío. Del ghetto a la milonga, Editorial Sudamericana, Buenos Aires 1998.
- Ricardo Feierstein, Historia de los judíos argentinos, Editorial Galerna, Buenos Aires, 2006

== Links ==
- Un violinista de raza, Clarín, 2005
- Todo Tango - Simón Bajour
- Official Website for Simon Bajour
- Tango history
- Article regarding Bajour
- Biography
