= Mościce, Masovian Voivodeship =

Mościce
- Village
- Location within Poland
- Coordinates: 52°57′3″N 20°31′31″E
- Country: Poland
- Voivodeship: Masovian
- County: Ciechanów
- Gmina: Regimin

Mościce [mɔɕˈt͡ɕit͡sɛ] is a village in the administrative district of Gmina Regimin, within Ciechanów County, Masovian Voivodeship, in east-central Poland.
