= Grudusk-Olszak =

- Village
- Location within Poland
- Coordinates: 53°04′39″N 20°36′41″E
- Country: Poland
- Voivodeship: Masovian
- County: Ciechanów
- Gmina: Grudusk

Grudusk-Olszak [ˈɡrudusk ˈɔlʂak] is a village in the administrative district of Gmina Grudusk, within Ciechanów County, Masovian Voivodeship, in east-central Poland. The district has a population of 3750, with 245 Business entities.
