= Konarzewo Wielkie =

- Village
- Location within Poland
- Coordinates: 52°50′20″N 20°50′55″E
- Country: Poland
- Voivodeship: Masovian
- County: Ciechanów
- Gmina: Gołymin-Ośrodek

Konarzewo Wielkie [kɔnaˈʐɛvɔ ˈvjɛlkʲɛ] is a village located in the administrative district of Gmina Gołymin-Ośrodek, within Ciechanów County, Masovian Voivodeship, in east-central Poland.
