= Polanka, Masovian Voivodeship =

Polanka
- Village
- Location within Poland
- Coordinates: 52°58′51″N 20°37′37″E
- Country: Poland
- Voivodeship: Masovian
- County: Ciechanów
- Gmina: Grudusk

Polanka [pɔˈlaŋka] is a village in the administrative district of Gmina Grudusk, within Ciechanów County, Masovian Voivodeship, in east-central Poland.
