= Zawady Włościańskie =

- Village
- Location within Poland
- Coordinates: 52°47′52″N 20°54′57″E
- Country: Poland
- Voivodeship: Masovian
- County: Ciechanów
- Gmina: Gołymin-Ośrodek

Zawady Włościańskie (Polish pronunciation: [zaˈvadɨ vwɔɕˈtɕaj̃skʲɛ]) is a village in the administrative district of Gmina Gołymin-Ośrodek, within Ciechanów County, Masovian Voivodeship, in east-central Poland.
