= Radziwie, Ciechanów County =

Radziwie
- Village
- Location within Poland
- Coordinates: 52°44′N 20°35′E
- Country: Poland
- Voivodeship: Masovian
- County: Ciechanów
- Gmina: Ojrzeń
- Population: 33

Radziwie [raˈd͡ʑivjɛ] is a village in the administrative district of Gmina Ojrzeń, within Ciechanów County, Masovian Voivodeship, in east-central Poland.
