= Dębowo, Ciechanów County =

Dębowo
- Village
- Location within Poland
- Coordinates: 52°58′43″N 20°38′56″E
- Country: Poland
- Voivodeship: Masovian
- County: Ciechanów
- Gmina: Grudusk

Dębowo [dɛmˈbɔvɔ] is a village in the administrative district of Gmina Grudusk, within Ciechanów County, Masovian Voivodeship, in east-central Poland.
