= Leśniewo Górne =

Village in Gmina Grudusk, Poland

- Village
- Location within Poland
- Coordinates: 52°59′21″N 20°36′54″E
- Country: Poland
- Voivodeship: Masovian
- County: Ciechanów
- Gmina: Grudusk

Leśniewo Górne [lɛɕˈɲɛvɔ ˈɡurnɛ] is a village in the administrative district of Gmina Grudusk, within Ciechanów County, Masovian Voivodeship, in east-central Poland.
