= Konarzewo-Reczki =

- Village
- Location within Poland
- Coordinates: 52°49′2″N 20°55′18″E
- Country: Poland
- Voivodeship: Masovian
- County: Ciechanów
- Gmina: Gołymin-Ośrodek

Konarzewo-Reczki [kɔnaˈʐɛvɔ ˈrɛt͡ʂki] is a village in the administrative district of Gmina Gołymin-Ośrodek, within Ciechanów County, Masovian Voivodeship, in east-central Poland.
