= Koźniewo Wielkie =

- Village
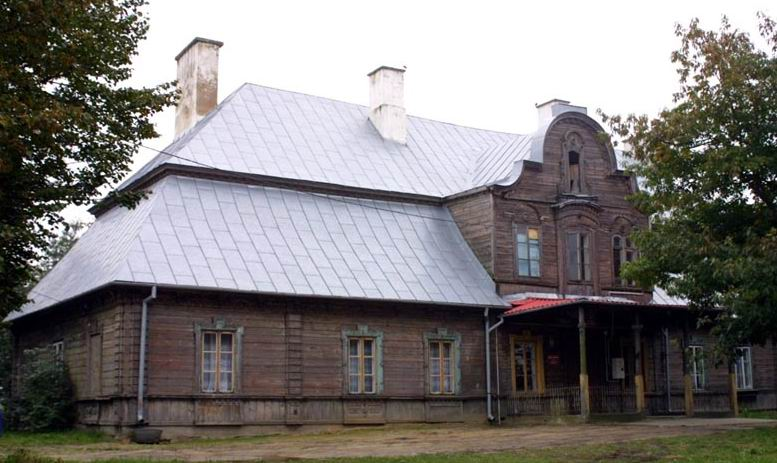
- Baroque mansion, built of larch in the 18th century

- Location within Poland
- Coordinates: 52°44′49″N 20°45′42″E
- Country: Poland
- Voivodeship: Masovian
- County: Ciechanów
- Gmina: Sońsk
- Population: 308

Koźniewo Wielkie [kɔʑˈɲɛvɔ ˈvjɛlkʲɛ] is a village in the administrative district of Gmina Sońsk, within Ciechanów County, Masovian Voivodeship, in east-central Poland.
