= Pawłówko, Ciechanów County =

Pawłówko
- Village
- Location within Poland
- Coordinates: 52°54′N 20°33′E
- Country: Poland
- Voivodeship: Masovian
- County: Ciechanów
- Gmina: Regimin

Pawłówko [paˈvwufkɔ] is a village in the administrative district of Gmina Regimin, within Ciechanów County, Masovian Voivodeship, in east-central Poland.
