= Rosofsky =

Rosofsky is a surname. Notable people with the name include:

- Julio Jorge Nelson (1913–1976), born Isaac Rosofsky, Argentine tango musician
- Barney Ross (1909–1967), born Dov-Ber David Rosofsky, American boxing champion
- Seymour Rosofsky (1924–1981), American artist
