= Kliczki =

- Village
- Location within Poland
- Coordinates: 52°57′N 20°32′E
- Country: Poland
- Voivodeship: Masovian
- County: Ciechanów
- Gmina: Regimin

Kliczki [ˈklit͡ʂki] is a village in the administrative district of Gmina Regimin, within Ciechanów County, Masovian Voivodeship, in east-central Poland.
