= Stryjewo Wielkie =

- Village
- Location within Poland
- Coordinates: 53°0′N 20°39′E
- Country: Poland
- Voivodeship: Masovian
- County: Ciechanów
- Gmina: Grudusk

Stryjewo Wielkie [strɨˈjɛvɔ ˈvjɛlkʲɛ] is a village in the administrative district of Gmina Grudusk, within Ciechanów County, Masovian Voivodeship, in east-central Poland.
