= Szwejki, Ciechanów County =

Szwejki
- Village
- Location within Poland
- Coordinates: 52°47′11″N 20°43′15″E
- Country: Poland
- Voivodeship: Masovian
- County: Ciechanów
- Gmina: Sońsk
- Population: 102

Szwejki [ˈʂfɛi̯ki] is a village in the administrative district of Gmina Sońsk, within Ciechanów County, Masovian Voivodeship, in east-central Poland.
