= Mężenino-Węgłowice =

- Village
- Location within Poland
- Coordinates: 52°49′39″N 20°44′14″E
- Country: Poland
- Voivodeship: Masovian
- County: Ciechanów
- Gmina: Sońsk
- Population: 52

Mężenino-Węgłowice [mɛ̃ʐɛˈninɔ vɛŋɡwɔˈvit͡sɛ] is a village in the administrative district of Gmina Sońsk, within Ciechanów County, Masovian Voivodeship, in east-central Poland.
