= Włosty =

Włosty may refer to the following places:

- Włosty, Masovian Voivodeship (east-central Poland)
- Włosty, Gołdap County in Warmian-Masurian Voivodeship (north Poland)
- Włosty, Pisz County in Warmian-Masurian Voivodeship (north Poland)
