= Kalisz, Masovian Voivodeship =

Kalisz
- Village
- Location within Poland
- Coordinates: 52°56′N 20°39′E
- Country: Poland
- Voivodeship: Masovian
- County: Ciechanów
- Gmina: Regimin
- Time zone: UTC+1 (CET)
  - Summer (DST): UTC+2 (CEST)
- Vehicle registration: WCI

Kalisz [ˈkaliʂ] is a village in the administrative district of Gmina Regimin, within Ciechanów County, Masovian Voivodeship, in east-central Poland.
