= Chrościce-Łyczki =

- Village
- Location within Poland
- Coordinates: 52°46′36″N 20°38′44″E
- Country: Poland
- Voivodeship: Masovian
- County: Ciechanów
- Gmina: Sońsk

Chrościce-Łyczki [xrɔɕˈt͡ɕit͡sɛ ˈwɨt͡ʂki] is a village in the administrative district of Gmina Sońsk, within Ciechanów County, Masovian Voivodeship, in east-central Poland.
