= Damięty-Narwoty =

Village in Gmina Sońsk, Poland

- Village
- Location within Poland
- Coordinates: 52°47′26″N 20°39′39″E
- Country: Poland
- Voivodeship: Masovian
- County: Ciechanów
- Gmina: Sońsk

Damięty-Narwoty [daˈmjɛntɨ narˈvɔtɨ] is a village in the administrative district of Gmina Sońsk, within Ciechanów County, Masovian Voivodeship, in east-central Poland.
