= Koźniewo Średnie =

- Village
- Location within Poland
- Coordinates: 52°44′05″N 20°44′26″E
- Country: Poland
- Voivodeship: Masovian
- County: Ciechanów
- Gmina: Sońsk
- Population: 226

Koźniewo Średnie [kɔʑˈɲɛvɔ ˈɕrɛdɲɛ] is a village in the administrative district of Gmina Sońsk, within Ciechanów County, Masovian Voivodeship, in east-central Poland.
