= Pszczółki Górne =

- Village
- Location within Poland
- Coordinates: 53°3′N 20°41′E
- Country: Poland
- Voivodeship: Masovian
- County: Ciechanów
- Gmina: Grudusk

Pszczółki Górne [ˈpʂt͡ʂuu̯ki ˈɡurnɛ] is a village in the administrative district of Gmina Grudusk, within Ciechanów County, Masovian Voivodeship, in east-central Poland.
