= Leśniewo Dolne =

- Village
- Location within Poland
- Coordinates: 52°59′N 20°38′E
- Country: Poland
- Voivodeship: Masovian
- County: Ciechanów
- Gmina: Grudusk

Leśniewo Dolne [lɛɕˈɲɛvɔ ˈdɔlnɛ] is a village in the administrative district of Gmina Grudusk, within Ciechanów County, Masovian Voivodeship, in east-central Poland.
