= Gogole-Steczki =

- Village
- Location within Poland
- Coordinates: 52°49′40″N 20°49′33″E
- Country: Poland
- Voivodeship: Masovian
- County: Ciechanów
- Gmina: Gołymin-Ośrodek
- Time zone: UTC+1 (CET)
  - Summer (DST): UTC+2 (CEST)

Gogole-Steczki [ɡɔˈɡɔlɛ ˈstɛt͡ʂki] is a village in the administrative district of Gmina Gołymin-Ośrodek, within Ciechanów County, Masovian Voivodeship, in east-central Poland.

Five Polish citizens were murdered by Nazi Germany in the Gogole-Steczki and Gogole Wielkie during World War II.
