= Chruściele =

Chruściele may refer to the following places:

- Chruściele, Ciechanów County in Masovian Voivodeship (east-central Poland)
- Chruściele, Wołomin County in Masovian Voivodeship (east-central Poland)
- Chruściele, Warmian-Masurian Voivodeship (north Poland)
