= Ślubowo =

- Village
- Location within Poland
- Coordinates: 52°43′N 20°45′E
- Country: Poland
- Voivodeship: Masovian
- County: Ciechanów
- Gmina: Sońsk
- Population: 250

Ślubowo [ɕluˈbɔvɔ] is a village in the administrative district of Gmina Sońsk, within Ciechanów County, Masovian Voivodeship, in east-central Poland.
