= Humięcino-Klary =

Village in Gmina Grudusk, Poland

- Village
- Location within Poland
- Coordinates: 53°0′31″N 20°37′57″E
- Country: Poland
- Voivodeship: Masovian
- County: Ciechanów
- Gmina: Grudusk

Humięcino-Klary [xumjɛnˈt͡ɕinɔ ˈklarɨ] is a village in the administrative district of Gmina Grudusk, within Ciechanów County, Masovian Voivodeship, in east-central Poland.
