= Truszki, Masovian Voivodeship =

Truszki
- Village
- Location within Poland
- Coordinates: 52°50′58″N 20°42′59″E
- Country: Poland
- Voivodeship: Masovian
- County: Ciechanów
- Gmina: Gołymin-Ośrodek

Truszki [ˈtruʂki] is a village in the administrative district of Gmina Gołymin-Ośrodek, within Ciechanów County, Masovian Voivodeship, in east-central Poland.
