= Jarluty Małe =

- Village
- Location within Poland
- Coordinates: 52°59′N 20°31′E
- Country: Poland
- Voivodeship: Masovian
- County: Ciechanów
- Gmina: Regimin

Jarluty Małe [jarˈlutɨ ˈmawɛ] is a village in the administrative district of Gmina Regimin, within Ciechanów County, Masovian Voivodeship, in east-central Poland.
