= Purzyce-Rozwory =

- Village
- Location within Poland
- Coordinates: 53°04′9.38″N 20°35′13.83″E
- Country: Poland
- Voivodeship: Masovian
- County: Ciechanów
- Gmina: Grudusk

Purzyce-Rozwory [puˈʐɨt͡sɛ rɔzˈvɔrɨ] is a village in the administrative district of Gmina Grudusk, within Ciechanów County, Masovian Voivodeship, in east-central Poland.
