= Pajewo-Szwelice =

- Village
- Location within Poland
- Coordinates: 52°52′N 20°46′E
- Country: Poland
- Voivodeship: Masovian
- County: Ciechanów
- Gmina: Gołymin-Ośrodek

Pajewo-Szwelice [paˈjɛvɔ ʂfɛˈlit͡sɛ] is a village in the administrative district of Gmina Gołymin-Ośrodek, within Ciechanów County, Masovian Voivodeship, in east-central Poland.According to the National Census of Population and Housing from 2011, the population in the village of Pajewo-Szwelice is 52, of which 48.1% of the population are women, and 51.9% of the population are male. The town is inhabited by 1.3% of the inhabitants of the commune. The identifier of the Pajewo-Szwelice locality in the SIMC system is 0115275.
