= Mierzanowo-Kolonia =

- Village
- Location within Poland
- Coordinates: 53°01′24″N 20°34′41″E
- Country: Poland
- Voivodeship: Masovian
- County: Ciechanów
- Gmina: Grudusk

Mierzanowo-Kolonia [mjɛʐaˈnɔvɔ kɔˈlɔɲa] is a village in the administrative district of Gmina Grudusk, within Ciechanów County, Masovian Voivodeship, in east-central Poland.
