= Morawy-Wicherki =

- Village
- Location within Poland
- Coordinates: 52°50′05″N 20°46′53″E
- Country: Poland
- Voivodeship: Masovian
- County: Ciechanów
- Gmina: Gołymin-Ośrodek

Morawy-Wicherki [mɔˈravɨ viˈxɛrki] is a village in the administrative district of Gmina Gołymin-Ośrodek, within Ciechanów County, Masovian Voivodeship, in east-central Poland.
