= Zakrzewo Wielkie =

Zakrzewo Wielkie may refer to the following places:

- Zakrzewo Wielkie, Ciechanów County in Masovian Voivodeship (east-central Poland)
- Zakrzewo Wielkie, Mława County in Masovian Voivodeship (east-central Poland)
- Zakrzewo Wielkie, Gmina Zaręby Kościelne, Ostrów County in Masovian Voivodeship (east-central Poland)
