= Baraniec =

Baraniec may refer to the following places:

- Baraniec, Greater Poland Voivodeship (west-central Poland)
- Baraniec, Ciechanów County in Masovian Voivodeship (east-central Poland)
- Baraniec, Maków County in Masovian Voivodeship (east-central Poland)
