= Bajour (disambiguation) =

Bajour may refer to:

- Bajour District, a subdivision of Pakistan
- Bajour (musical), a Broadway musical
- Szymsia Bajour, a Jewish Polish-Argentine violinist
