= Grzybowo =

Grzybowo may refer to the following places:

- Grzybowo, Ciechanów County in Masovian Voivodeship (north-central Poland)
- Grzybowo, Mława County in Masovian Voivodeship (north-central Poland)
- Grzybowo, Płońsk County in Masovian Voivodeship (north-central Poland)
- Grzybowo, Wągrowiec County in Greater Poland Voivodeship (west-central Poland)
- Grzybowo, Września County in Greater Poland Voivodeship (west-central Poland)
- Grzybowo, Pomeranian Voivodeship (north Poland)
- Grzybowo, Gmina Człuchów in Pomeranian Voivodeship (north Poland)
- Grzybowo, Giżycko County in Warmian-Masurian Voivodeship (north-east Poland)
- Grzybowo, Kętrzyn County in Warmian-Masurian Voivodeship (north-east Poland)
- Grzybowo, West Pomeranian Voivodeship (north-west Poland)
