= Humięcino-Andrychy =

Village in Gmina Grudusk, Poland

- Village
- Location within Poland
- Coordinates: 52°59′32″N 20°35′38″E
- Country: Poland
- Voivodeship: Masovian
- County: Ciechanów
- Gmina: Grudusk

Humięcino-Andrychy [xumjɛnˈt͡ɕinɔ anˈdrɨxɨ] is a village in the administrative district of Gmina Grudusk, within Ciechanów County, Masovian Voivodeship, in east-central Poland.
