= Soboklęszcz, Ciechanów County =

Village in Gmina Sońsk, Poland

Soboklęszcz
- Village
- Location within Poland
- Coordinates: 52°43′34″N 20°41′34″E
- Country: Poland
- Voivodeship: Masovian
- County: Ciechanów
- Gmina: Sońsk
- Population: 451

Soboklęszcz [sɔˈbɔklɛ̃ʂt͡ʂ] is a village in the administrative district of Gmina Sońsk, within Ciechanów County, Masovian Voivodeship, in east-central Poland.
