= Kałki =

Kałki may refer to the following places:

- Kałki, Lubusz Voivodeship (west Poland)
- Kałki, Masovian Voivodeship (east-central Poland)
- Kałki, Warmian-Masurian Voivodeship (north Poland)

== See also ==
- Kalki (disambiguation)
