= Młock-Kopacze =

- Village
- Location within Poland
- Coordinates: 52°47′N 20°27′E
- Country: Poland
- Voivodeship: Masovian
- County: Ciechanów
- Gmina: Ojrzeń

Młock-Kopacze [ˈmwɔt͡sk kɔˈpat͡ʂɛ] is a village in the administrative district of Gmina Ojrzeń, within Ciechanów County, Masovian Voivodeship, in east-central Poland.
