= Żarnowo =

Żarnowo may refer to the following places:

- Żarnowo, Masovian Voivodeship (east-central Poland)
- Żarnowo, Goleniów County in West Pomeranian Voivodeship (north-west Poland)
- Żarnowo, Pyrzyce County in West Pomeranian Voivodeship (north-west Poland)
- Żarnowo, Szczecinek County in West Pomeranian Voivodeship (north-west Poland)
