= Nieborzyn =

Nieborzyn may refer to the following places:

- Nieborzyn, Greater Poland Voivodeship (west-central Poland)
- Nieborzyn, Ciechanów County in Masovian Voivodeship (east-central Poland)
- Nieborzyn, Płońsk County in Masovian Voivodeship (east-central Poland)
