= Bieńki-Śmietanki =

Village in Gmina Sónsk, Poland

- Village
- Location within Poland
- Coordinates: 52°49′01″N 20°40′41″E
- Country: Poland
- Voivodeship: Masovian
- County: Ciechanów
- Gmina: Sońsk
- Population: 85

Bieńki-Śmietanki [ˈbjɛɲki ɕmjɛˈtanki] is a village in the administrative district of Gmina Sońsk, within Ciechanów County, Masovian Voivodeship, in east-central Poland.
