= Pajewo-Rżyski =

- Village
- Location within Poland
- Coordinates: 52°51′41″N 20°46′51″E
- Country: Poland
- Voivodeship: Masovian
- County: Ciechanów
- Gmina: Gołymin-Ośrodek

Pajewo-Rżyski [paˈjɛvɔ ˈrʐɨski] is a village in the administrative district of Gmina Gołymin-Ośrodek, within Ciechanów County, Masovian Voivodeship, in east-central Poland.
