= Żochy =

Żochy may refer to the following places:

- Żochy, Ciechanów County in Masovian Voivodeship (east-central Poland)
- Żochy, Ostrołęka County in Masovian Voivodeship (east-central Poland)
- Żochy, Sokołów County in Masovian Voivodeship (east-central Poland)
