= Purzyce-Trojany =

- Village
- Location within Poland
- Coordinates: 53°2′N 20°34′E
- Country: Poland
- Voivodeship: Masovian
- County: Ciechanów
- Gmina: Grudusk

Purzyce-Trojany [puˈʐɨt͡sɛ trɔˈjanɨ] is a village in the administrative district of Gmina Grudusk, within Ciechanów County, Masovian Voivodeship, in east-central Poland.
