= Lipa, Ciechanów County =

Lipa
- Village
- Location within Poland
- Coordinates: 52°58′N 20°41′E
- Country: Poland
- Voivodeship: Masovian
- County: Ciechanów
- Gmina: Regimin

Lipa [ˈlipa] is a village in the administrative district of Gmina Regimin, within Ciechanów County, Masovian Voivodeship, in east-central Poland.
