= Morawy-Laski =

- Village
- Location within Poland
- Coordinates: 52°50′15″N 20°47′33″E
- Country: Poland
- Voivodeship: Masovian
- County: Ciechanów
- Gmina: Gołymin-Ośrodek

Morawy-Laski (Polish pronunciation: [mɔˈravɨ ˈlaskʲi]) is a village in the administrative district of Gmina Gołymin-Ośrodek, within Ciechanów County, Masovian Voivodeship, in east-central Poland.
