= Sokolnik =

Sokolnik may refer to:

- Sokolnik, Bulgaria, a village
- Sokólnik, Ciechanów County, Masovian Voivodeship (east-central Poland)
- Sokolnik, Minsk County, Masovian Voivodeship (east-central Poland)
- Sokolnik, Warmian-Masurian Voivodeship (north Poland)
