= Brodzięcin =

- Village
- Location within Poland
- Coordinates: 52°45′N 20°35′E
- Country: Poland
- Voivodeship: Masovian
- County: Ciechanów
- Gmina: Ojrzeń

Brodzięcin [brɔˈd͡ʑɛnt͡ɕin] is a village in the administrative district of Gmina Ojrzeń, within Ciechanów County, Masovian Voivodeship, in east-central Poland.
