= Rąbież Gruduski =

- Village
- Location within Poland
- Coordinates: 53°04′50.98″N 20°39′24.95″E
- Country: Poland
- Voivodeship: Masovian
- County: Ciechanów
- Gmina: Grudusk

Rąbież Gruduski [ˈrɔmbjɛʂ ɡruˈduski] is a village in the administrative district of Gmina Grudusk, within Ciechanów County, Masovian Voivodeship, in east-central Poland.
