= Kraszewo, Masovian Voivodeship =

Kraszewo
- Village
- Location within Poland
- Coordinates: 52°48′N 20°34′E
- Country: Poland
- Voivodeship: Masovian
- County: Ciechanów
- Gmina: Ojrzeń

Kraszewo [kraˈʂɛvɔ] is a village in the administrative district of Gmina Ojrzeń, within Ciechanów County, Masovian Voivodeship, in east-central Poland.
