= Wola Ostaszewska =

- Village
- Location within Poland
- Coordinates: 52°46′N 20°49′E
- Country: Poland
- Voivodeship: Masovian
- County: Ciechanów
- Gmina: Sońsk
- Population: 122

Wola Ostaszewska [ˈvɔla ɔstaˈʂɛfska] is a village in the administrative district of Gmina Sońsk, within Ciechanów County, Masovian Voivodeship, in east-central Poland.
