= Humięcino-Retki =

Village in Gmina Grudusk, Poland

- Village
- Location within Poland
- Coordinates: 53°0′52″N 20°35′11″E
- Country: Poland
- Voivodeship: Masovian
- County: Ciechanów
- Gmina: Grudusk
- Population: 180

Humięcino-Retki [xumjɛnˈt͡ɕinɔ ˈrɛtki] is a village in the administrative district of Gmina Grudusk, within Ciechanów County, Masovian Voivodeship, in east-central Poland.
