= Przybyszewo, Masovian Voivodeship =

Przybyszewo
- Village
- Location within Poland
- Coordinates: 52°58′N 20°35′E
- Country: Poland
- Voivodeship: Masovian
- County: Ciechanów
- Gmina: Regimin

Przybyszewo [pʂɨbɨˈʂɛvɔ] is a village in the administrative district of Gmina Regimin, within Ciechanów County, Masovian Voivodeship, in east-central Poland.
