= Gogole Wielkie =

- Village
- Location within Poland
- Coordinates: 52°50′N 20°49′E
- Country: Poland
- Voivodeship: Masovian
- County: Ciechanów
- Gmina: Gołymin-Ośrodek
- Time zone: UTC+1 (CET)
  - Summer (DST): UTC+2 (CEST)

Gogole Wielkie [ɡɔˈɡɔlɛ ˈvjɛlkʲɛ] is a village in the administrative district of Gmina Gołymin-Ośrodek, within Ciechanów County, Masovian Voivodeship, in east-central Poland.

Five Polish citizens were murdered by Nazi Germany in the Gogole Wielkie and Gogole-Steczki during World War II.
