= Grabówiec, Ciechanów County =

Grabówiec
- Village
- Location within Poland
- Coordinates: 52°48′N 20°32′E
- Country: Poland
- Voivodeship: Masovian
- County: Ciechanów
- Gmina: Ojrzeń

Grabówiec [ɡraˈbuvjɛt͡s] is a village in the administrative district of Gmina Ojrzeń, within Ciechanów County, Masovian Voivodeship, in east-central Poland.
