= Wola Gołymińska =

- Village
- Location within Poland
- Coordinates: 52°49′29″N 20°52′30″E
- Country: Poland
- Voivodeship: Masovian
- County: Ciechanów
- Gmina: Gołymin-Ośrodek

Wola Gołymińska [ˈvɔla ɡɔwɨˈmiɲska] is a village in the administrative district of Gmina Gołymin-Ośrodek, within Ciechanów County, Masovian Voivodeship, in east-central Poland.
