= Raúl Kaplún =

Argentine violinist (1910–1990)

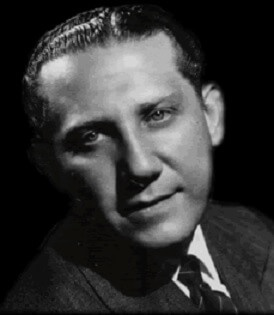
- Raúl Kaplún

Background information
- Born: Israel Kaflún; November 11, 1910; Buenos Aires, Buenos Aires Province, Argentina
- Died: January 23, 1990 (aged 79) Buenos Aires, Argentina
- Genres: Tango
- Occupations: Composer, Violinist, Musical Director
- Instrument: Violin

Raúl Kaplún (November 11, 1910 - January 23, 1990) (born Israel Kaflún) was a well-known tango violinist, director and composer.

== Biography ==
Raúl Kaplún was born in Balvanera, Buenos Aires to an itinerant Jewish hat salesman Leiser Finkel who had immigrated to Argentina from Bessarabia.

Kaplun was sent to the cheder of the synagogue on Paso Street, as well as to study the violin from Marcos Sadoski. He later studied with José Fraga and later with the prestigious German Edmund Weigand.

He was the author of Que solo estoy, Canción de rango, Una emoción and Solitario.

Kaplun refused to join the Peronist party, and as a result his band was barred from the radio.

He is buried in the Cementerio Israelita de la Tablada in Buenos Aires.

He was one of a group of prominent Jewish tango musicians, including Szymsia Bajour, Carlos Aguirre, Julio Jorge Nelson and Ismael Spitalnik.
