= Obrąb =

Obrąb may refer to the following places:

- Obrąb, Ciechanów County in Masovian Voivodeship (east-central Poland)
- Obrąb, Przasnysz County in Masovian Voivodeship (east-central Poland)
- Obrąb, Wyszków County in Masovian Voivodeship (east-central Poland)
- Obrąb, West Pomeranian Voivodeship (north-west Poland)
