= Ciemniewko =

- Village
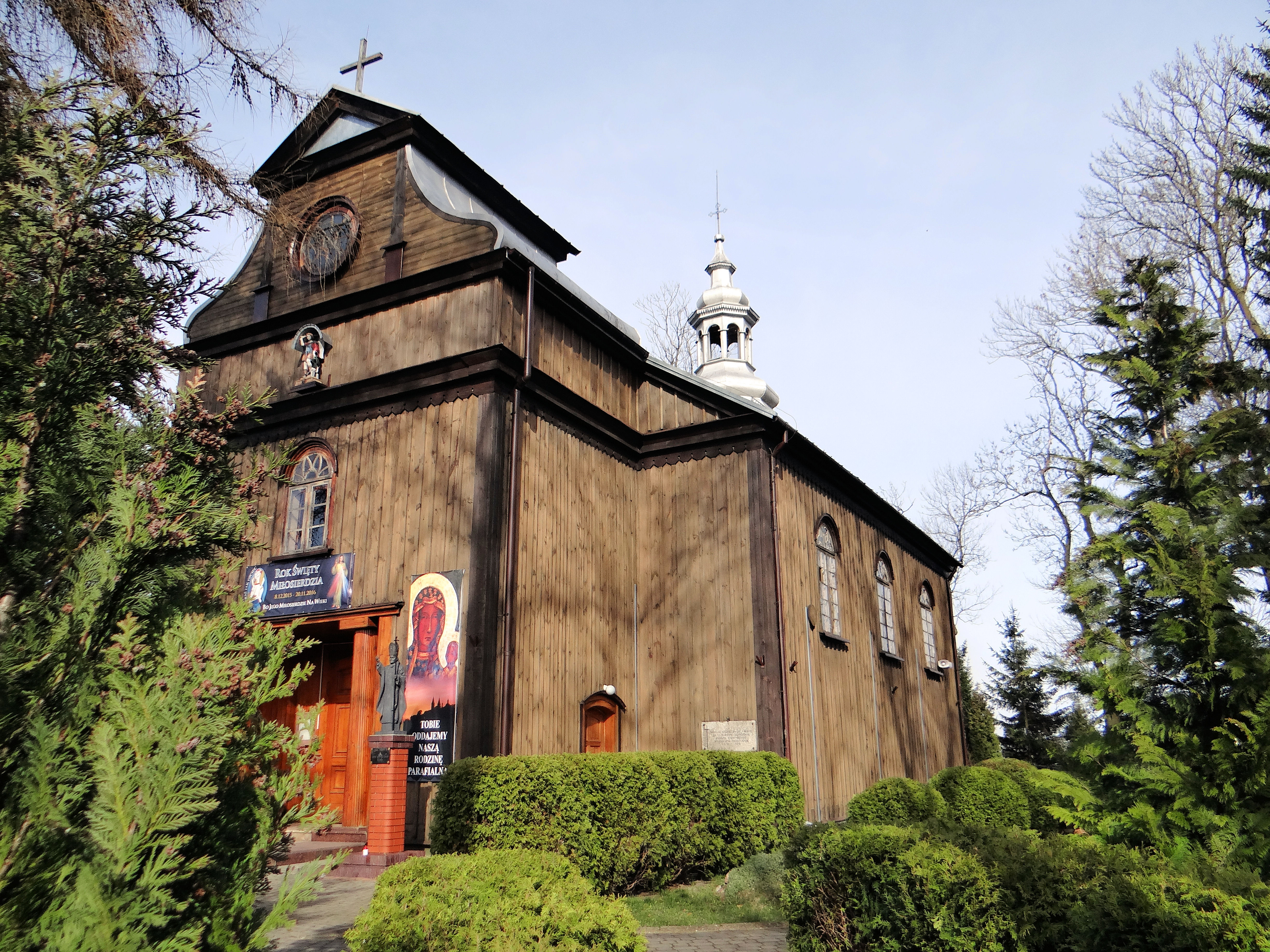
- The Church of St. Nicholas in Ciemniewko.

- Location within Poland
- Coordinates: 52°49′N 20°45′E
- Country: Poland
- Voivodeship: Masovian
- County: Ciechanów
- Gmina: Sońsk
- Population: 247

Ciemniewko [t͡ɕɛmˈɲɛfkɔ] is a village in the administrative district of Gmina Sońsk, within Ciechanów County, Masovian Voivodeship, in east-central Poland.
