= Wróblewo, Ciechanów County =

Wróblewo
- Village
- Location within Poland
- Coordinates: 52°51′59″N 20°44′10″E
- Country: Poland
- Voivodeship: Masovian
- County: Ciechanów
- Gmina: Gołymin-Ośrodek

Wróblewo [vruˈblɛvɔ] is a village in the administrative district of Gmina Gołymin-Ośrodek, within Ciechanów County, Masovian Voivodeship, in east-central Poland.
