= Ciemniewo =

Ciemniewo may refer to the following places:

- Ciemniewo, Ciechanów County in Masovian Voivodeship (east-central Poland)
- Ciemniewo, Maków County in Masovian Voivodeship (east-central Poland)
- Ciemniewo, Płońsk County in Masovian Voivodeship (east-central Poland)
