= Gostkowo, Ciechanów County =

Gostkowo
- Village
- Location within Poland
- Coordinates: 52°51′11″N 20°44′40″E
- Country: Poland
- Voivodeship: Masovian
- County: Ciechanów
- Gmina: Gołymin-Ośrodek

Gostkowo [ɡɔstˈkɔvɔ] is a village in the administrative district of Gmina Gołymin-Ośrodek, within Ciechanów County, Masovian Voivodeship, in east-central Poland.
