= Grudusk-Brzozowo =

- Village
- Location within Poland
- Coordinates: 53°04′31″N 20°36′20″E
- Country: Poland
- Voivodeship: Masovian
- County: Ciechanów
- Gmina: Grudusk

Grudusk-Brzozowo [ˈɡrudusk bʐɔˈzɔvɔ] is a village in the administrative district of Gmina Grudusk, within Ciechanów County, Masovian Voivodeship, in east-central Poland.
