= Zawady Dworskie, Ciechanów County =

Zawady Dworskie
- Village
- Location within Poland
- Coordinates: 52°48′09″N 20°54′23″E
- Country: Poland
- Voivodeship: Masovian
- County: Ciechanów
- Gmina: Gołymin-Ośrodek

Zawady Dworskie [zaˈvadɨ ˈdvɔrskʲɛ] is a village in the administrative district of Gmina Gołymin-Ośrodek, within Ciechanów County, Masovian Voivodeship, in east-central Poland.
