= Kicin, Masovian Voivodeship =

Kicin
- Village
- Location within Poland
- Coordinates: 52°45′N 20°31′E
- Country: Poland
- Voivodeship: Masovian
- County: Ciechanów
- Gmina: Ojrzeń

Kicin [ˈkit͡ɕin] is a village in the administrative district of Gmina Ojrzeń, within Ciechanów County, Masovian Voivodeship, in east-central Poland. It was established by German Mennonite and Lutheran settlers on the estate of Count Kicinski around 1842.
