= Borzuchowo-Daćbogi =

- Village
- Location within Poland
- Coordinates: 53°03′48.94″N 20°35′38.88″E
- Country: Poland
- Voivodeship: Masovian
- County: Ciechanów
- Gmina: Grudusk
- Population: 31

Borzuchowo-Daćbogi [bɔʐuˈxɔvɔ dat͡ɕˈbɔɡi] is a village in the administrative district of Gmina Grudusk, within Ciechanów County, Masovian Voivodeship, in East-Central Poland. The distance from the village to the capital city, Warsaw is approximately 95.7 kilometers (59.5 miles).
