= Sokołowo, Ciechanów County =

Sokołowo
- Village
- Location within Poland
- Coordinates: 53°4′N 20°37′E
- Country: Poland
- Voivodeship: Masovian
- County: Ciechanów
- Gmina: Grudusk
- Time zone: UTC+1 (CET)
  - Summer (DST): UTC+2 (CEST)

Sokołowo [sɔkɔˈwɔvɔ] is a village in the administrative district of Gmina Grudusk, within Ciechanów County, Masovian Voivodeship, in east-central Poland.

Five Polish citizens were murdered by Nazi Germany in the village during World War II.
