= Przyrowa =

Przyrowa may refer to the following places:

- Przyrowa, Tuchola County in Kuyavian-Pomeranian Voivodeship (north-central Poland)
- Przyrowa, Rypin County in Kuyavian-Pomeranian Voivodeship (north-central Poland)
- Przyrowa, Masovian Voivodeship (east-central Poland)
