= Koźniewo-Łysaki =

- Village
- Location within Poland
- Coordinates: 52°45′18″N 20°43′54″E
- Country: Poland
- Voivodeship: Masovian
- County: Ciechanów
- Gmina: Sońsk
- Population: 117

Koźniewo-Łysaki [kɔʑˈɲɛvɔ wɨˈsaki] is a village in the administrative district of Gmina Sońsk, within Ciechanów County, Masovian Voivodeship, in east-central Poland.
