= Bieńki-Karkuty =

- Village
- Location within Poland
- Coordinates: 52°48′32″N 20°40′30″E
- Country: Poland
- Voivodeship: Masovian
- County: Ciechanów
- Gmina: Sońsk

Bieńki-Karkuty [ˈbjɛɲki karˈkutɨ] is a village in the administrative district of Gmina Sońsk, within Ciechanów County, Masovian Voivodeship, in east-central Poland.
