= Witold Małcużyński =

Polish pianist (1914–1977)

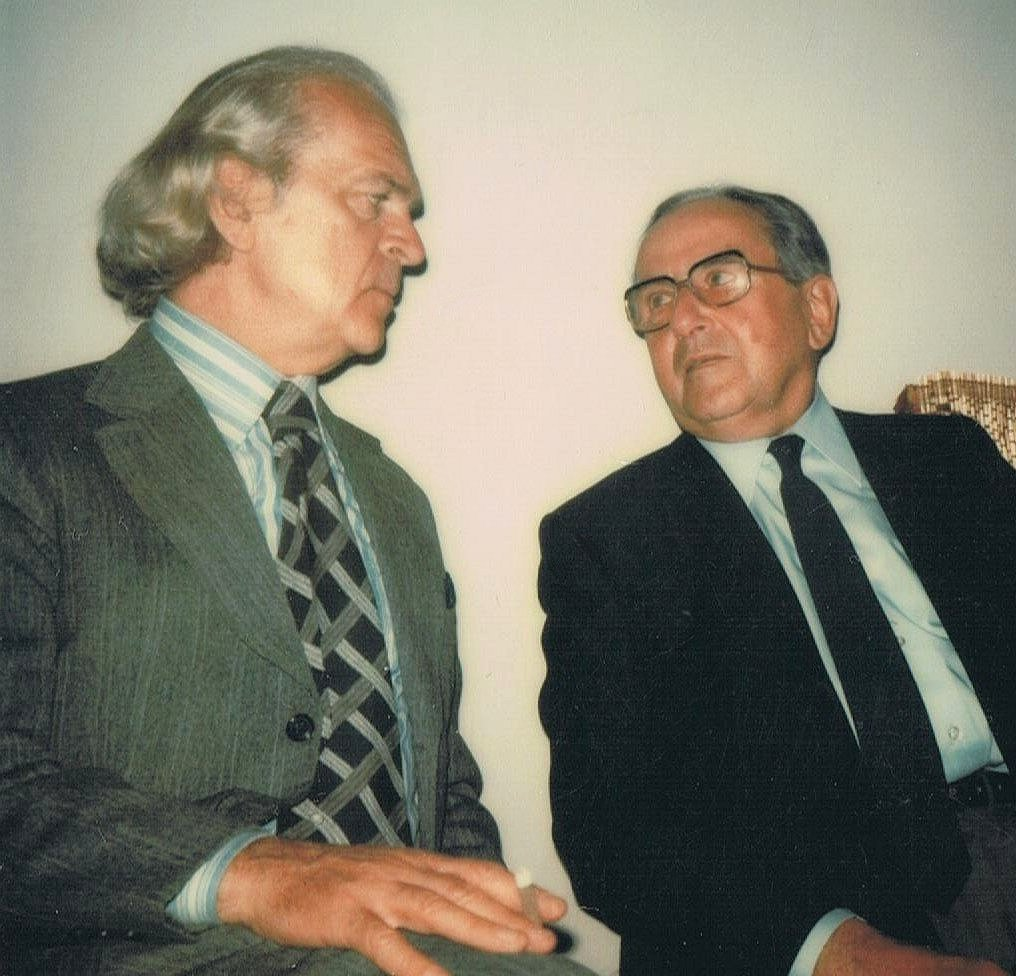
- Małcużyński (left) in 1976

Background information
- Born: August 10, 1914; Koziczyn, Congress Poland, Russian Empire
- Died: July 17, 1977 (aged 62) Palma de Mallorca, Spain
- Genres: Classical music
- Instrument: piano
- Labels: Columbia Records, EMI

Witold Małcużyński (August 10, 1914 – July 17, 1977) was a Polish pianist who specialized in the works of Frédéric Chopin.

== Biography ==
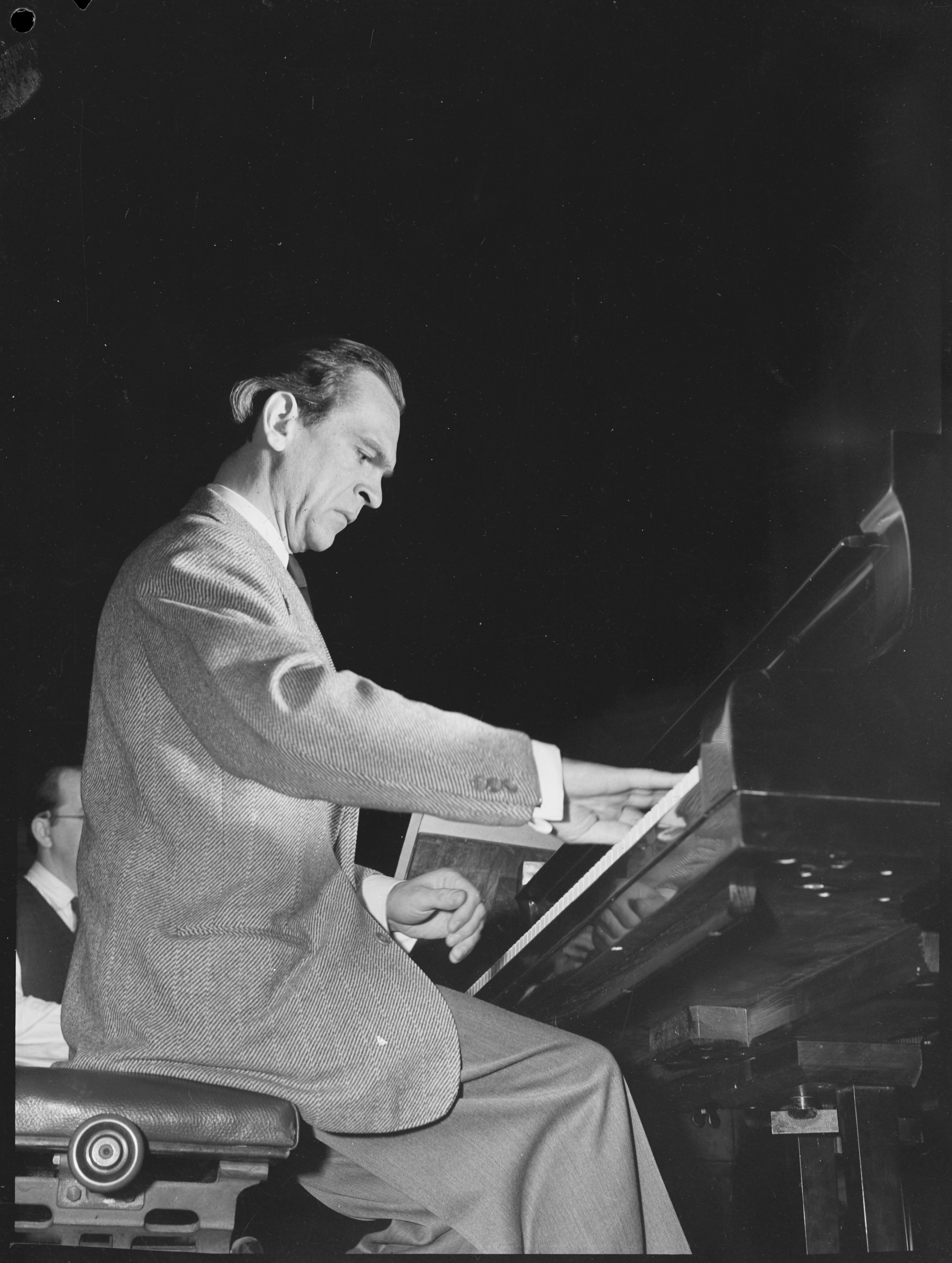
Malcuzynski at piano, Sydney, 1949

Małcużyński was born in 1914 in Koziczyn (Congress Poland, Russian Empire). He was the older brother of Karol Małcużyński, a Polish politician and journalist. He began playing piano at the age of 5, starting regular lessons four years later. Originally, he intended to study law but his innate love of music overcame his initial decision and he switched to music and enrolled at the Warsaw Conservatory from which he graduated with high honours, studying under Józef Turczyński. In 1936, he received an invitation to study under Marguerite Long and Isidor Philipp in Paris. He won the third prize at the III International Chopin Piano Competition in Warsaw in 1937. At the same time, he met his future wife, the French pianist Colette Gaveau.

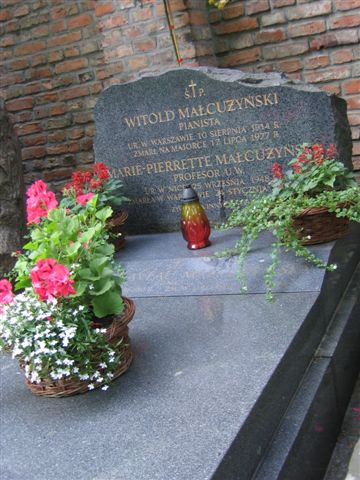
Małcużyński's grave at Powązki Cemetery

When World War II began, he was in France. There, he joined the artistic-propaganda section of the Polish Army and visited military camps. After the capitulation of France, he and his new wife escaped in a sealed traincar to Portugal, where he met the conductor Grzegorz Fitelberg, who offered him a tour of South America. Małcużyński went to Argentina in October 1940. In April 1942 he relocated to the United States. Essential to his American career was the violinist Yehudi Menuhin, who initially helped him with management issues. After the war, he moved to Switzerland.

He was a member of the jury of the International Chopin Competition in 1960 and 1970, the Queen Elisabeth Music Competition (Belgium) in 1960, and the Paloma O'Shea International Piano Competition in 1976.

He was conferred an Officer's Cross of the Order of Polonia Restituta. He died in 1977 in Palma de Mallorca, Spain, and was buried in the Powązki Cemetery, Poland.

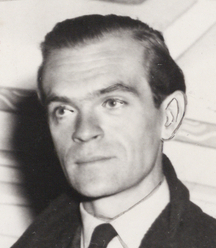

== Selected discography (CD) ==
- 1989 Witold Małcużyński Plays Chopin (Polskie Nagrania)
- 1993 Witold Małcużyński - Fantasies-Nocturnes-Scherzos (Allegro Corporation)
- 1993 Malcuzynski Plays Chopin - Grand Polonaise, Volume 2 (Allegro Corporation)
- 1994 Malcuzynski: Artist Profile (Chopin: Piano Concerto No. 2/Piano Sonata No. 3/Waltzes/Mazurkas) (EMI Classic)
- 1999 Witold Małcuzynski - Chopin-Rachmaninov (Dante)
- 2000 Witold Malcuzynski Plays Chopin, Liszt and Szymanowski (Piano Masters) (Pearl)
- 2001 Witold Malcuzynski - Brahms-Beethoven-Chopin (Aura Classics)
- 2001 Witold Malcuzynski Plays Great Romantic Piano Music (2CD) (Royal Long Players)
- 2003 Witold Małcużyński Brahms-Franck-Bach-Busoni (Polskie Nagrania)
- 2006 Witold Małcużyński - Johannes Brahms Piano Concerto No.1 in D minor op.15 (Polskie Nagrania)
- 2007 Witold Małcużyński - Chopin: Piano Concerto No. 2; Rachmaninov: Piano Concerto No. 3 (nagr. 1946-1949) (Guild)
- 2007 Witold Malcuzynski Intermezzo (Fabula Classica)
- 2010 Witold Małcużyński - Chopin (digipack) (Polskie Radio)

== Sources ==
- Roger Hauert & Bernard Gavoty. "Malcuzynski", Great Concert Artists Series, Kister, Genève, 1957.
- Skarbowski, Jerzy. "Witold Małcużyński - pianista potężny", Poradnik Muzyczny, n° 7/8, 1989.
- Wolny, Marcin. "Rocznica śmierci Witolda Małcużyńskiego". Forum Polonijne. 4 (2007): 38. ISSN 1234-2807.
- Jeżewski, Krzysztof. "Witold Małcużyński - W trzydziestą rocznicę śmierci", Głos Katolicki, n° 26, Paris, 15-22.7.2007
- Narodowy Instytut Fryderyka Chopina - Witold Małcużyński
