= Bieńki-Skrzekoty =

Village in Gmina Sońsk, Poland

- Village
- Location within Poland
- Coordinates: 52°48′4″N 20°40′29″E
- Country: Poland
- Voivodeship: Masovian
- County: Ciechanów
- Gmina: Sońsk

Bieńki-Skrzekoty [ˈbjɛɲki skʂɛˈkɔtɨ] is a village in the administrative district of Gmina Sońsk, within Ciechanów County, Masovian Voivodeship, in east-central Poland.
