= Olszewka =

Olszewka may refer to the following places:

- Olszewka, Nakło County in Kuyavian-Pomeranian Voivodeship (north-central Poland)
- Olszewka, Ciechanów County in Masovian Voivodeship (east-central Poland)
- Olszewka, Ostrołęka County in Masovian Voivodeship (east-central Poland)
- Olszewka, Przasnysz County in Masovian Voivodeship (east-central Poland)
