= Rybakówka, Masovian Voivodeship =

Rybakówka
- Village
- Location within Poland
- Coordinates: 52°47′42″N 20°51′06″E
- Country: Poland
- Voivodeship: Masovian
- County: Ciechanów
- Gmina: Gołymin-Ośrodek

Rybakówka [rɨbaˈkufka] is a village in the administrative district of Gmina Gołymin-Ośrodek, within Ciechanów County, Masovian Voivodeship, in east-central Poland.
