= Skrobocin =

- Village
- Location within Poland
- Coordinates: 52°45′16″N 20°41′20″E
- Country: Poland
- Voivodeship: Masovian
- County: Ciechanów
- Gmina: Sońsk

Population
  - Total: 85
- Time zone: UTC+1 (CET)
  - Summer (DST): UTC+2 (CEST)
- Vehicle registration: WCI

Skrobocin [skrɔˈbɔt͡ɕin] is a village in the administrative district of Gmina Sońsk, within Ciechanów County, Masovian Voivodeship, in north-central Poland.

Two Polish citizens were murdered by Nazi Germany in the village during World War II.

== Demographics ==
Demographic structure as of 31 March 2011:

	Under working age	Working age	Over working age	Total
Men	9	27	4	40
Women	6	21	9	36
Total	15	48	13	76
