= Pszczółki-Szerszenie =

- Village
- Location within Poland
- Coordinates: 53°2′0″N 20°38′53″E
- Country: Poland
- Voivodeship: Masovian
- County: Ciechanów
- Gmina: Grudusk
- Population: 40

Pszczółki-Szerszenie [ˈpʂt͡ʂuu̯ki ʂɛrˈʂɛɲɛ] is a village in the administrative district of Gmina Grudusk, within Ciechanów County, Masovian Voivodeship, in east-central Poland.
