= Chroscice =

Chroscice may refer to the following places in Poland:

- Chrościce, Ciechanów County, Masovian Voivodeship
- Chrościce, Mińsk County, Masovian Voivodeship
- Chróścice, Opole Voivodeship
