= Osada-Wola =

- Village
- Location within Poland
- Coordinates: 52°43′N 20°31′E
- Country: Poland
- Voivodeship: Masovian
- County: Ciechanów
- Gmina: Ojrzeń

Osada-Wola [ɔˈsada ˈvɔla] is a village in the administrative district of Gmina Ojrzeń, within Ciechanów County, Masovian Voivodeship, in east-central Poland.
