= Gutków, Masovian Voivodeship =

Gutków
- Village
- Location within Poland
- Coordinates: 52°44′9″N 20°39′2″E
- Country: Poland
- Voivodeship: Masovian
- County: Ciechanów
- Gmina: Sońsk

Population
  - Total: 236
- Time zone: UTC+1 (CET)
  - Summer (DST): UTC+2 (CEST)
- Vehicle registration: WCI

Gutków [ˈɡutkuf] is a village in the administrative district of Gmina Sońsk, within Ciechanów County, Masovian Voivodeship, in north-central Poland.

Four Polish citizens were murdered by Nazi Germany in the village during World War II.
