= Karniewo, Ciechanów County =

Karniewo
- Village
- Location within Poland
- Coordinates: 52°57′N 20°35′E
- Country: Poland
- Voivodeship: Masovian
- County: Ciechanów
- Gmina: Regimin

Karniewo [karˈɲɛvɔ] is a village in the administrative district of Gmina Regimin, within Ciechanów County, Masovian Voivodeship, in east-central Poland.

== Information Service in Network ==
News, photos..

http://www.naszekarniewo.wa.pl
