= Pszczółki-Czubaki =

- Village
- Location within Poland
- Coordinates: 53°2′30″N 20°38′55″E
- Country: Poland
- Voivodeship: Masovian
- County: Ciechanów
- Gmina: Grudusk
- Population: 20

Pszczółki-Czubaki [ˈpʂt͡ʂuu̯ki t͡ʂuˈbaki] is a village in the administrative district of Gmina Grudusk, within Ciechanów County, Masovian Voivodeship, in east-central Poland.
