= Bronisławie =

- Village
- Location within Poland
- Coordinates: 52°47′N 20°33′E
- Country: Poland
- Voivodeship: Masovian
- County: Ciechanów
- Gmina: Ojrzeń
- Population: 152

Bronisławie [brɔniˈswavjɛ] is a village in Gmina Ojrzeń, Ciechanów County, Masovian Voivodeship, Poland.
