= Nasierowo Górne =

- Village
- Location within Poland
- Coordinates: 52°51′N 20°43′E
- Country: Poland
- Voivodeship: Masovian
- County: Ciechanów
- Gmina: Gołymin-Ośrodek

Nasierowo Górne [naɕɛˈrɔvɔ ˈɡurnɛ] is a village in the administrative district of Gmina Gołymin-Ośrodek, within Ciechanów County, Masovian Voivodeship, in east-central Poland.
