= Sarnowa Góra =

- Village
- Location within Poland
- Coordinates: 52°47′N 20°37′E
- Country: Poland
- Voivodeship: Masovian
- County: Ciechanów
- Gmina: Sońsk
- Population: 259

Sarnowa Góra [sarˈnɔva ˈɡura] is a village in the administrative district of Gmina Sońsk, within Ciechanów County, Masovian Voivodeship, in east-central Poland.
