= Chruściele, Ciechanów County =

Chruściele
- Village
- Location within Poland
- Coordinates: 52°51′19″N 20°45′33″E
- Country: Poland
- Voivodeship: Masovian
- County: Ciechanów
- Gmina: Gołymin-Ośrodek

Chruściele [xruɕˈt͡ɕɛlɛ] is a village in the administrative district of Gmina Gołymin-Ośrodek, within Ciechanów County, Masovian Voivodeship, in east-central Poland.
