= Sokólnik =

- Village
- Location within Poland
- Coordinates: 53°04′06″N 20°34′34″E
- Country: Poland
- Voivodeship: Masovian
- County: Ciechanów
- Gmina: Grudusk
- Population: 23

Sokólnik [sɔˈkulnik] is a village in the administrative district of Gmina Grudusk, within Ciechanów County, Masovian Voivodeship, in east-central Poland.
