= Nieborzyn, Ciechanów County =

Village in Masovian Voivodeship, Poland

Nieborzyn
- Village
- Location within Poland
- Coordinates: 52°59′N 20°40′E
- Country: Poland
- Voivodeship: Masovian
- County: Ciechanów
- Gmina: Grudusk

Nieborzyn [ɲɛˈbɔʐɨn] is a village in the administrative district of Gmina Grudusk, within Ciechanów County, Masovian Voivodeship, in east-central Poland.
