= Chrościce, Ciechanów County =

Chrościce
- Village
- Location within Poland
- Coordinates: 52°46′27″N 20°40′09″E
- Country: Poland
- Voivodeship: Masovian
- County: Ciechanów
- Gmina: Sońsk

Population
  - Total: 134

Chrościce [xrɔɕˈt͡ɕit͡sɛ] is a village in the administrative district of Gmina Sońsk, within Ciechanów County, Masovian Voivodeship, in east-central Poland.
