= Gmina Grudusk =

Gmina Grudusk Grudusk Commune
- Gmina
- Coat of arms
- Interactive map of Gmina Grudusk
- Coordinates (Grudusk): 53°3′31″N 20°37′29″E
- Country: Poland
- Voivodeship: Masovian
- County: Ciechanów
- Seat: Grudusk

Area
  - Total: 96.69 km^{2} (37.33 sq mi)

Population (2013)
  - Total: 3,823
  - Density: 39.54/km^{2} (102.4/sq mi)

Gmina Grudusk is a rural gmina (administrative district) in Ciechanów County, Masovian Voivodeship, in east-central Poland. Its seat is the village of Grudusk, which lies approximately 22 kilometres (14 mi) north of Ciechanów and 97 km (60 mi) north of Warsaw.

The gmina covers an area of 96.69 square kilometres (37.3 sq mi), and as of 2006 its total population is 3,892 (3,823 in 2013).

== Villages ==
Gmina Grudusk contains the villages and settlements of:

- Borzuchowo-Daćbogi
- Dębowo
- Grudusk
- Grudusk-Brzozowo
- Grudusk-Olszak
- Humięcino
- Humięcino-Andrychy
- Humięcino-Klary
- Humięcino-Koski
- Humięcino-Retki
- Kołaki Małe
- Kołaki Wielkie
- Leśniewo Dolne
- Leśniewo Górne
- Łysakowo
- Mierzanowo
- Mierzanowo-Kolonia
- Nieborzyn
- Polanka
- Przywilcz
- Pszczółki Górne
- Pszczółki-Czubaki
- Pszczółki-Szerszenie
- Purzyce-Rozwory
- Purzyce-Trojany
- Rąbież Gruduski
- Sokólnik
- Sokołowo
- Stryjewo Wielkie
- Strzelnia
- Wiksin
- Wiśniewo
- Zakrzewo Małe
- Zakrzewo Wielkie
- Żarnowo

== Neighbouring gminas ==
Gmina Grudusk is bordered by the gminas of Czernice Borowe, Dzierzgowo, Regimin, Stupsk and Szydłowo.
