= Ciemniewo, Ciechanów County =

Ciemniewo
- Village
- Location within Poland
- Coordinates: 52°48′N 20°46′E
- Country: Poland
- Voivodeship: Masovian
- County: Ciechanów
- Gmina: Sońsk
- Population: 247

Ciemniewo [t͡ɕɛmˈɲɛvɔ] is a village in the administrative district of Gmina Sońsk, within Ciechanów County, Masovian Voivodeship, in east-central Poland.
