= Regimin =

- Village
- Location within Poland
- Coordinates: 52°56′N 20°34′E
- Country: Poland
- Voivodeship: Masovian
- County: Ciechanów
- Gmina: Regimin

Regimin [rɛˈɡimin] is a village in Ciechanów County, Masovian Voivodeship, in east-central Poland. It is the seat of the gmina (administrative district) called Gmina Regimin.
