= Łysakowo, Ciechanów County =

Łysakowo
- Village
- Location within Poland
- Coordinates: 53°1′N 20°37′E
- Country: Poland
- Voivodeship: Masovian
- County: Ciechanów
- Gmina: Grudusk

Łysakowo [wɨsaˈkɔvɔ] is a village in the administrative district of Gmina Grudusk, within Ciechanów County, Masovian Voivodeship, in east-central Poland.
