= Gmina Ojrzeń =

Gmina Ojrzeń Ojrzeń Commune
- Gmina
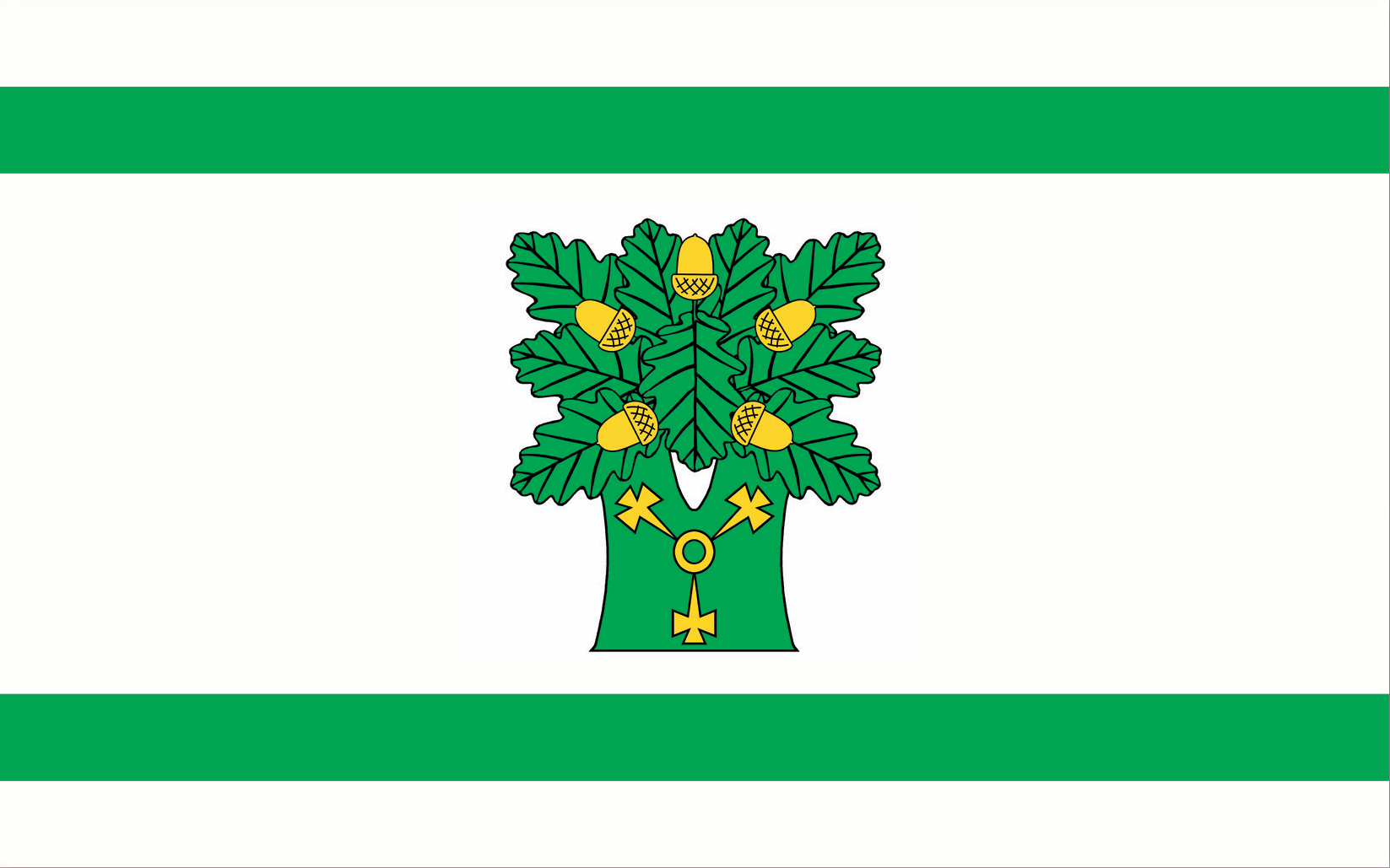
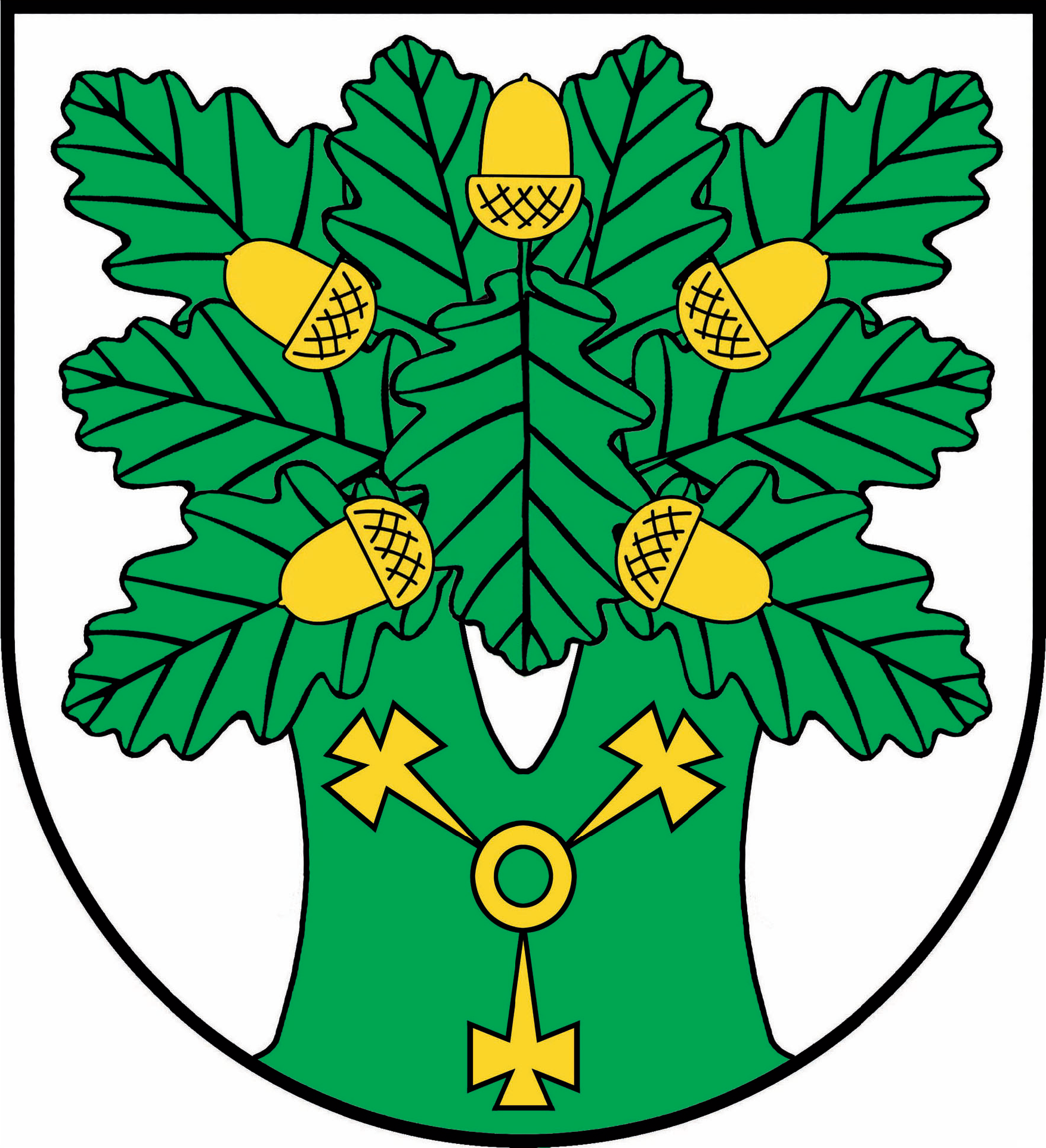
- Flag Coat of arms
- Interactive map of Gmina Ojrzeń
- Coordinates (Ojrzeń): 52°46′6″N 20°32′41″E
- Country: Poland
- Voivodeship: Masovian
- County: Ciechanów
- Seat: Ojrzeń

Area
  - Total: 123.11 km^{2} (47.53 sq mi)

Population (2013)
  - Total: 4,384
  - Density: 35.61/km^{2} (92.23/sq mi)

Gmina Ojrzeń is a rural gmina (administrative district) in Ciechanów County, Masovian Voivodeship, in east-central Poland. Its seat is the village of Ojrzeń, which lies approximately 13 kilometres (8 mi) south-west of Ciechanów and 69 km (43 mi) north-west of Warsaw.

The gmina covers an area of 123.11 square kilometres (47.5 sq mi), and as of 2006 its total population is 4,393 (4,384 in 2013).

== Villages ==
Gmina Ojrzeń contains the villages and settlements of Baraniec, Brodzięcin, Bronisławie, Dąbrowa, Gostomin, Grabówiec, Halinin, Kałki, Kicin, Kownaty-Borowe, Kraszewo, Łebki Wielkie, Lipówiec, Luberadz, Luberadzyk, Młock, Młock-Kopacze, Nowa Wieś, Obrąb, Ojrzeń, Osada-Wola, Przyrowa, Radziwie, Rzeszotko, Skarżynek, Trzpioły, Wojtkowa Wieś, Wola Wodzyńska, Zielona and Żochy.

== Neighbouring gminas ==
Gmina Ojrzeń is bordered by the gminas of Ciechanów, Glinojeck, Sochocin and Sońsk.
