= Kalaki =

Kalaki may refer to:

- Kalki, a Hindu god
- Kalaki District, a district in Eastern Uganda that was formerly a county of the Kaberamaido District
- Kələki, Azerbaijan

== See also ==
- Kalki (disambiguation)
