= Gmina Regimin =

Gmina Regimin Regimin Commune
- Gmina
- Interactive map of Gmina Regimin
- Coordinates (Regimin): 52°56′N 20°34′E
- Country: Poland
- Voivodeship: Masovian
- County: Ciechanów
- Seat: Regimin

Area
  - Total: 111.29 km^{2} (42.97 sq mi)

Population (2013)
  - Total: 5,069
  - Density: 45.55/km^{2} (118.0/sq mi)

Gmina Regimin is a rural gmina (administrative district) in Ciechanów County, Masovian Voivodeship, in east-central Poland. Its seat is the village of Regimin, which lies approximately 9 kilometres (6 mi) north-west of Ciechanów and 85 km (53 mi) north of Warsaw.

The gmina covers an area of 111.29 square kilometres (43.0 sq mi), and as of 2006 its total population is 4,955 (5,069 in 2013).

== Villages ==
Gmina Regimin contains the villages and settlements of Grzybowo, Jarluty Duże, Jarluty Małe, Kalisz, Karniewo, Kątki, Klice, Kliczki, Kozdroje, Koziczyn, Lekówiec, Lekowo, Lipa, Mościce, Pawłówko, Pawłowo, Pniewo Wielkie, Pniewo-Czeruchy, Przybyszewo, Radomka, Regimin, Szulmierz, Targonie, Trzcianka, Włosty, and Zeńbok.

== Neighbouring gminas ==
Gmina Regimin is bordered by the gminas of Ciechanów, Czernice Borowe, Grudusk, Opinogóra Górna, Strzegowo, and Stupsk.
