= Gmina Sońsk =

Gmina Sońsk Sońsk Commune
- Gmina
- Flag Coat of arms
- Interactive map of Gmina Sońsk
- Coordinates (Sońsk): 52°47′N 20°43′E
- Country: Poland
- Voivodeship: Masovian
- County: Ciechanów
- Seat: Sońsk

Area
  - Total: 154.99 km^{2} (59.84 sq mi)

Population (2013)
  - Total: 7,938
  - Density: 51.22/km^{2} (132.6/sq mi)
- Website: http://www.sonsk.pl

Gmina Sońsk is a rural gmina (administrative district) in Ciechanów County, Masovian Voivodeship, in east-central Poland. Its seat is the village of Sońsk, which lies approximately 11 kilometres (7 mi) south-east of Ciechanów and 66 km (41 mi) north of Warsaw.

The gmina covers an area of 154.99 square kilometres (59.8 sq mi), and as of 2006 its total population is 8,047 (7,938 in 2013).

== Villages ==
Gmina Sońsk contains the villages and settlements of Bądkowo, Bieńki-Karkuty, Bieńki-Skrzekoty, Bieńki-Śmietanki, Burkaty, Chrościce, Chrościce-Łyczki, Cichawy, Ciemniewko, Ciemniewo, Damięty-Narwoty, Drążewo, Gąsocin, Gołotczyzna, Gutków, Kałęczyn, Komory Błotne, Komory Dąbrowne, Kosmy-Pruszki, Koźniewo Średnie, Koźniewo Wielkie, Koźniewo-Łysaki, Łopacin, Marusy, Mężenino-Węgłowice, Niesłuchy, Olszewka, Ostaszewo, Pękawka, Sarnowa Góra, Skrobocin, Ślubowo, Soboklęszcz, Sońsk, Spądoszyn, Strusin, Strusinek, Szwejki and Wola Ostaszewska.

== Neighbouring gminas ==
Gmina Sońsk is bordered by the gminas of Ciechanów, Gołymin-Ośrodek, Gzy, Nowe Miasto, Ojrzeń, Sochocin and Świercze.
