= Żarnowo, Masovian Voivodeship =

Village in Masovian Voivodeship, Poland

Żarnowo
- Village
- Location within Poland
- Coordinates: 53°05′28″N 20°36′38″E
- Country: Poland
- Voivodeship: Masovian
- County: Ciechanów
- Gmina: Grudusk

Żarnowo [ʐarˈnɔvɔ] is a village in the administrative district of Gmina Grudusk, within Ciechanów County, Masovian Voivodeship, in east-central Poland.
