= Baraniec, Ciechanów County =

Baraniec
- Village
- Location within Poland
- Coordinates: 52°47′N 20°28′E
- Country: Poland
- Voivodeship: Masovian
- County: Ciechanów
- Gmina: Ojrzeń

Baraniec [baˈraɲɛt͡s] is a village in the administrative district of Gmina Ojrzeń, within Ciechanów County, Masovian Voivodeship, in east-central Poland.
