= Koziczyn, Masovian Voivodeship =

Koziczyn
- Village
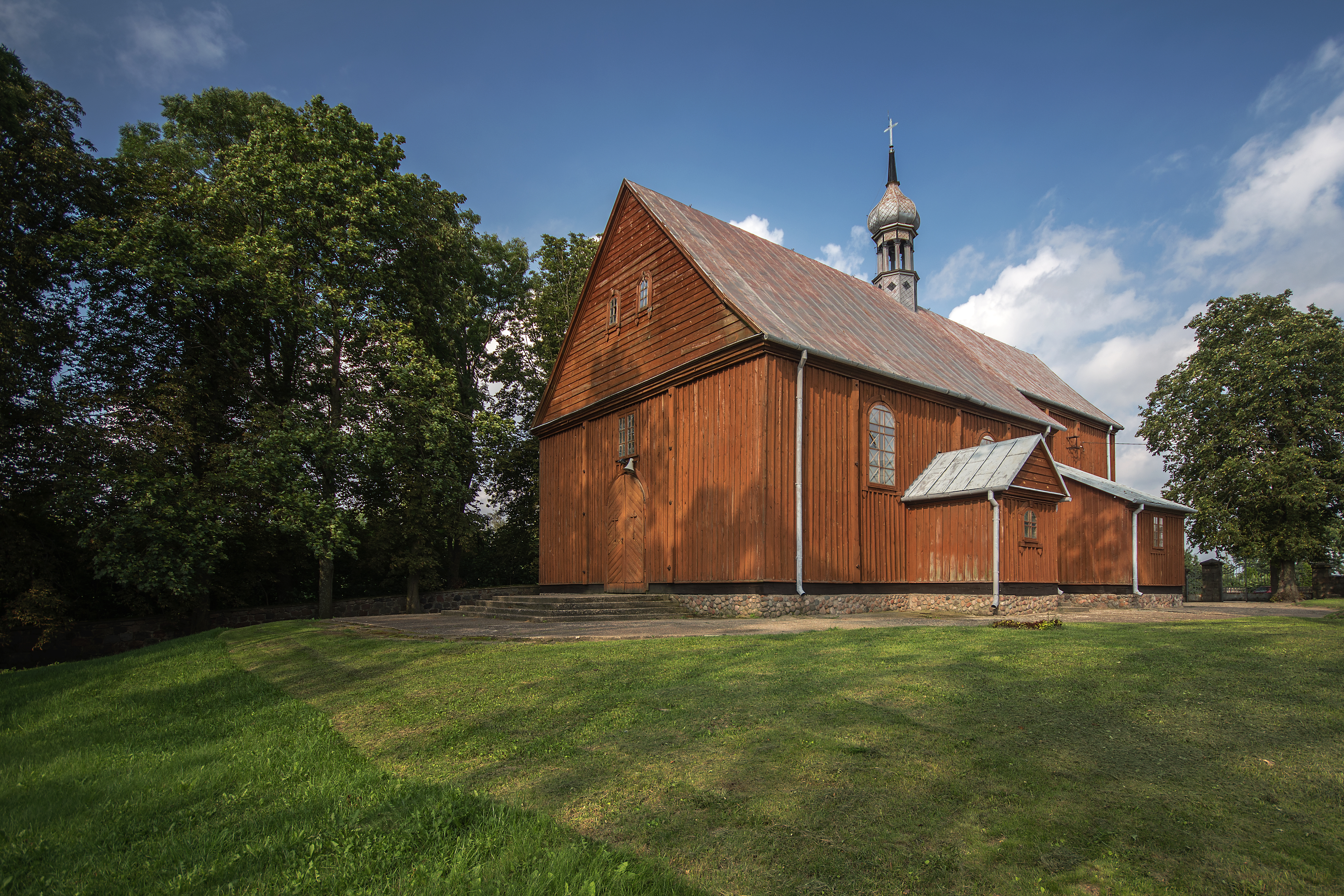
- Holy Trinity church

- Location within Poland
- Coordinates: 52°59′N 20°41′E
- Country: Poland
- Voivodeship: Masovian
- County: Ciechanów
- Gmina: Regimin
- Time zone: UTC+1 (CET)
  - Summer (DST): UTC+2 (CEST)
- Postal code: 06-461

Koziczyn [kɔˈʑit͡ʂɨn] is a village in the administrative district of Gmina Regimin, within Ciechanów County, Masovian Voivodeship, in north-central Poland.
