= Grudusk =

- Village
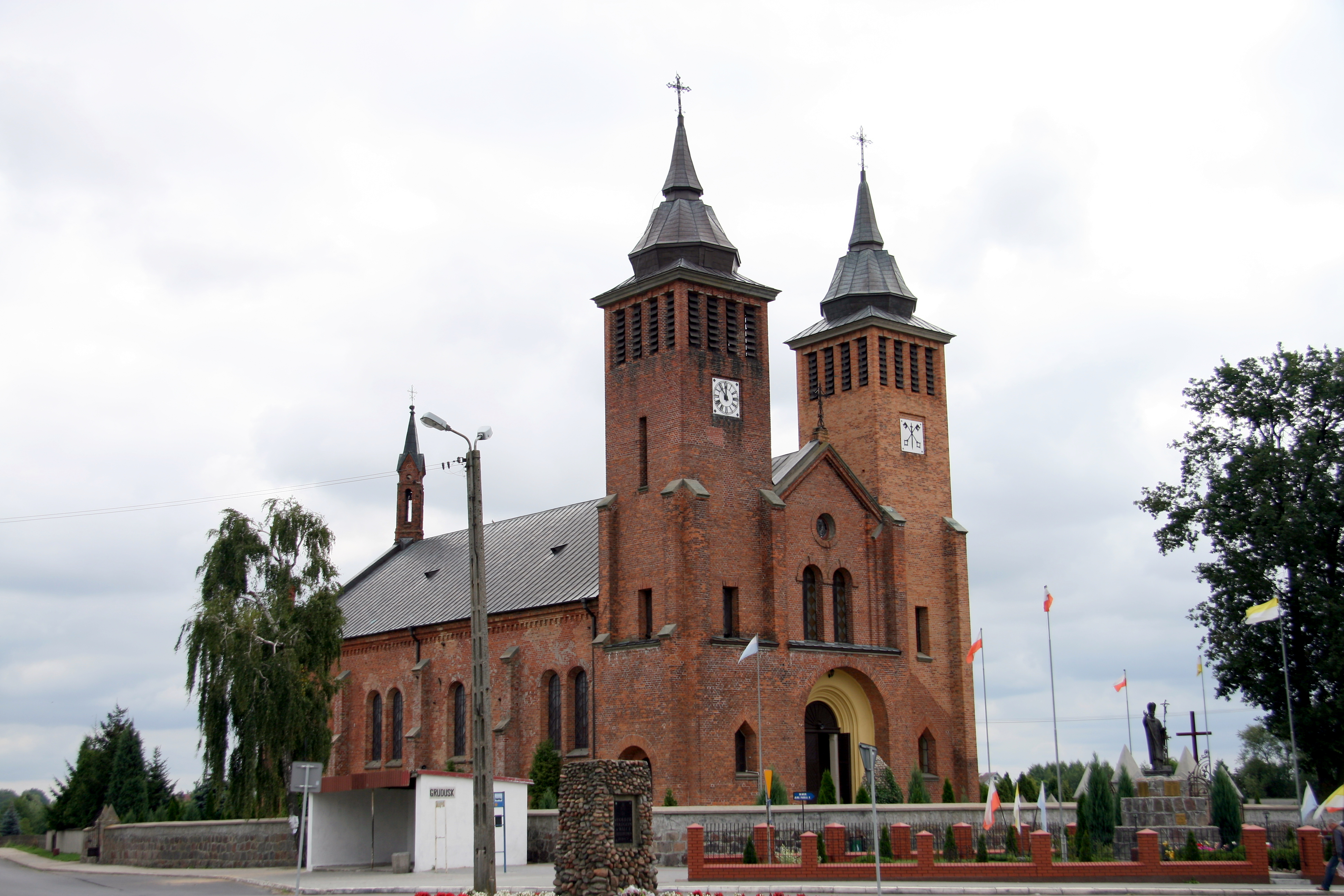
- 19th century church in Grudusk

- Location within Poland
- Coordinates: 53°3′31″N 20°37′29″E
- Country: Poland
- Voivodeship: Masovian
- County: Ciechanów
- Gmina: Grudusk

Population
  - Total: 1,500
- Time zone: UTC+1 (CET)
  - Summer (DST): UTC+2 (CEST)
- Vehicle registration: WCI
- Website: https://web.archive.org/web/20080203105443/http://www.grudusk.net/

Grudusk [ˈɡrudusk] is a village in Ciechanów County, Masovian Voivodeship, in north-central Poland. It is the seat of the gmina (administrative district) called Gmina Grudusk.

Ten Polish citizens were murdered by Nazi Germany in the village during World War II.
