= Zakrzewo Wielkie, Ciechanów County =

Zakrzewo Wielkie
- Village
- Location within Poland
- Coordinates: 53°1′N 20°34′E
- Country: Poland
- Voivodeship: Masovian
- County: Ciechanów
- Gmina: Grudusk

Zakrzewo Wielkie [zaˈkʂɛvɔ ˈvjɛlkʲɛ] is a village in the administrative district of Gmina Grudusk, within Ciechanów County, Masovian Voivodeship, in east-central Poland.
