= Przyrowa, Masovian Voivodeship =

Przyrowa
- Village
- Location within Poland
- Coordinates: 52°45′N 20°29′E
- Country: Poland
- Voivodeship: Masovian
- County: Ciechanów
- Gmina: Ojrzeń

Przyrowa [pʂɨˈrɔva] is a village in the administrative district of Gmina Ojrzeń, within Ciechanów County, Masovian Voivodeship, in east-central Poland.
