= Sońsk =

- Village
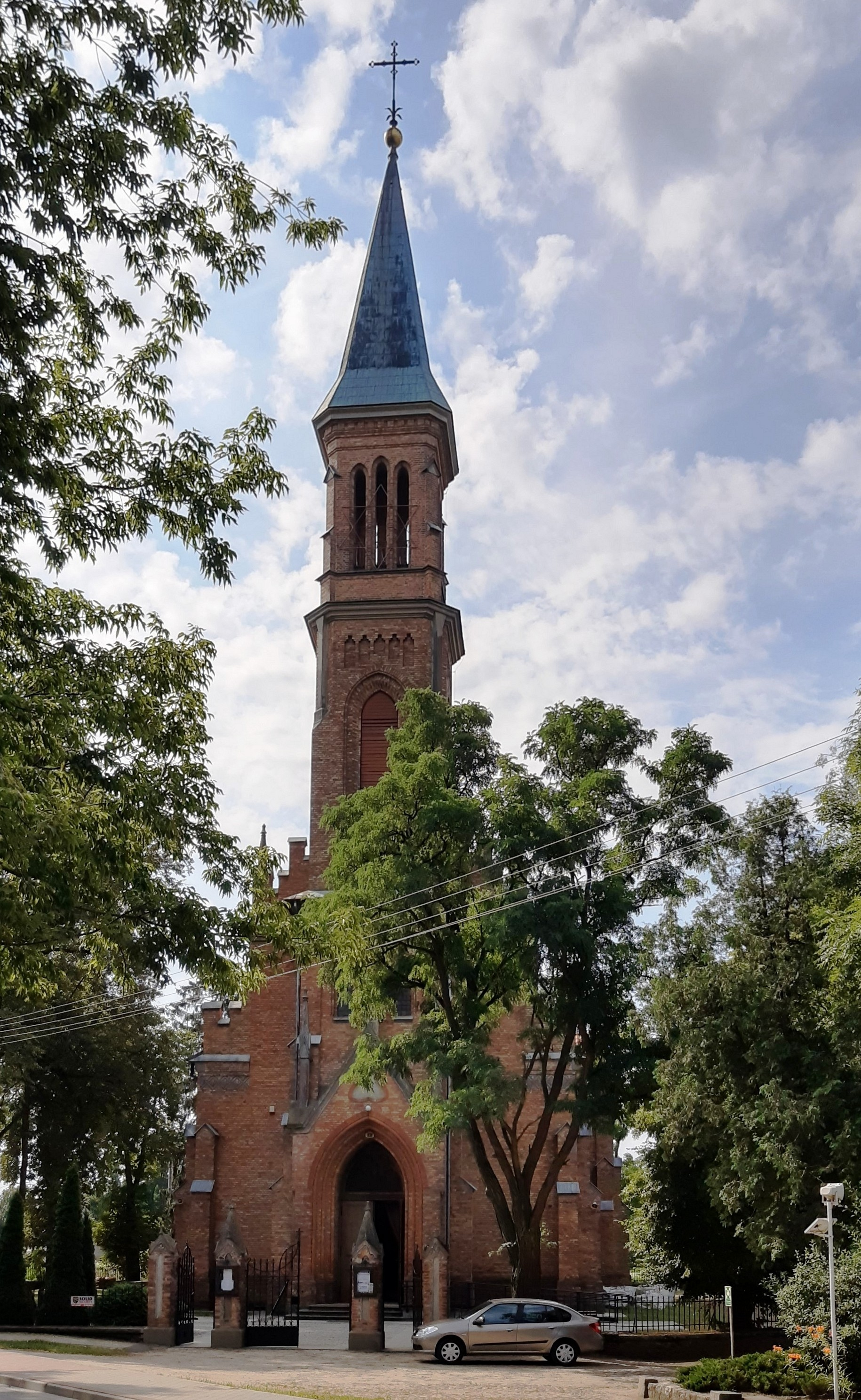
- Church of the Transfiguration of Jesus Christ in Sońsk

- Location within Poland
- Coordinates: 52°47′N 20°43′E
- Country: Poland
- Voivodeship: Masovian
- County: Ciechanów
- Gmina: Sońsk

Population
  - Total: 881
- Time zone: UTC+1 (CET)
  - Summer (DST): UTC+2 (CEST)
- Postal code: 06-430
- Vehicle registration: WCI

Sońsk [sɔɲsk] is a village in Ciechanów County, Masovian Voivodeship, in north-central Poland. It is the seat of the gmina (administrative district) called Gmina Sońsk.

== History ==
During the German occupation in World War II, in 1941, the occupiers established a forced labour camp for Poles, Jews and Russians in the village. Some prisoners were executed. In 1944, the camp was dissolved and surviving prisoners were deported to Germany.
