= Włosty, Masovian Voivodeship =

Włosty
- Village
- Location within Poland
- Coordinates: 52°57′42″N 20°36′16″E
- Country: Poland
- Voivodeship: Masovian
- County: Ciechanów
- Gmina: Regimin

Włosty [ˈvwɔstɨ] is a village in the administrative district of Gmina Regimin, within Ciechanów County, Masovian Voivodeship, in east-central Poland.
