= Gmina Gołymin-Ośrodek =

Gmina Gołymin-Ośrodek Gołymin-Ośrodek Commune
- Gmina
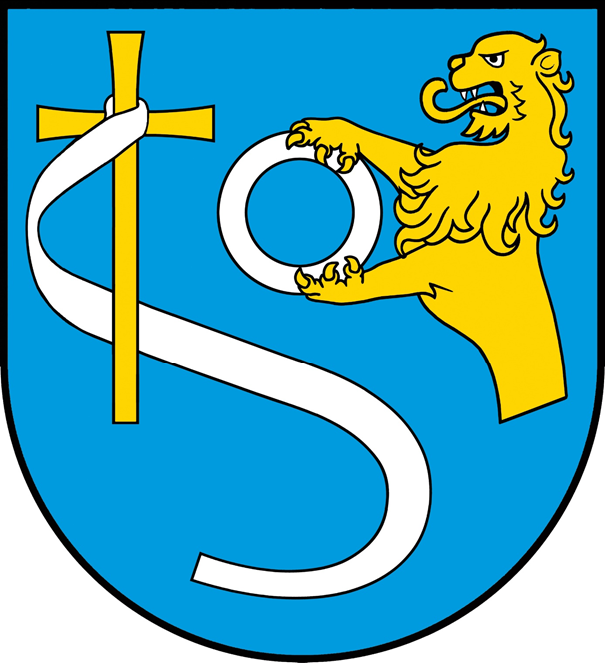
- Coat of arms
- Interactive map of Gmina Gołymin-Ośrodek
- Coordinates (Gołymin-Ośrodek): 52°48′29″N 20°52′18″E
- Country: Poland
- Voivodeship: Masovian
- County: Ciechanów
- Seat: Gołymin-Ośrodek

Area
  - Total: 110.55 km^{2} (42.68 sq mi)

Population (2022)
  - Total: 3,543
  - Density: 32.05/km^{2} (83.01/sq mi)
- Website: http://www.golymin-osrodek.pl/

Gmina Gołymin-Ośrodek is a rural gmina (administrative district) in Ciechanów County, Masovian Voivodeship, in east-central Poland. Its seat is the village of Gołymin-Ośrodek, which lies approximately 19 kilometres (11 mi) south-east of Ciechanów and 64 km (40 mi) north of Warsaw.

The gmina covers an area of 110.55 square kilometres (42.7 sq mi), and as of 2006 its total population is 4,006 (3,934 in 2013).

== Villages ==
Gmina Gołymin-Ośrodek contains the villages and settlements of Anielin, Chruściele, Garnowo Duże, Gogole Wielkie, Gogole-Steczki, Gołymin-Ośrodek, Gołymin-Północ, Gołymin-Południe, Gostkowo, Konarzewo Wielkie, Konarzewo-Gołąbki, Konarzewo-Marcisze, Konarzewo-Reczki, Konarzewo-Skuze, Konarzewo-Sławki, Mierniki, Morawka, Morawy-Kafasy, Morawy-Kopcie, Morawy-Laski, Morawy-Wicherki, Nasierowo Dolne, Nasierowo Górne, Nasierowo-Dziurawieniec, Nieradowo, Nowy Gołymin, Nowy Kałęczyn, Obiedzino Górne, Osiek Dolny, Osiek Górny, Osiek-Aleksandrowo, Osiek-Wólka, Pajewo Wielkie, Pajewo-Cyty, Pajewo-Rżyski, Pajewo-Szwelice, Ruszkowo, Rybakówka, Smosarz-Dobki, Smosarz-Pianki, Stare Garnowo, Truszki, Watkowo, Wielgołęka, Wola Gołymińska, Wróblewko, Wróblewo, Zawady Dworskie and Zawady Włościańskie.

== Neighbouring gminas ==
Gmina Gołymin-Ośrodek is bordered by the gminas of Ciechanów, Gzy, Karniewo, Krasne, Opinogóra Górna and Sońsk.
