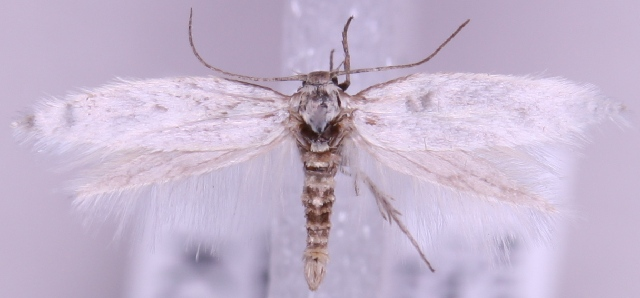

Scientific classification
- Kingdom: Animalia
- Phylum: Arthropoda
- Clade: Pancrustacea
- Class: Insecta
- Order: Lepidoptera
- Family: Elachistidae
- Genus: Elachista
- Species: E. kalki

Binomial name
- Elachista kalki Parenti, 1978

Synonyms
- Dibrachia kalki (Parenti, 1978)

= Elachista kalki =

Species of moth

Elachista kalki is a moth of the family Elachistidae. It is found in Austria, Germany, Greece, Hungary, Italy, Kazakhstan, and Russia (southern Urals, Volga region, Tuva Republic).

The length of the forewings is 4.8–5.5 mm for males and 4.8–5.2 mm for females.
