= Project Kalki =

2008 Virgin Comics mini-series

Project Kalki #1 (May 2008).

Project: Kalki is a four-issue mini-series currently published by Virgin Comics. Created by writer Arjun Gaind with art by Vivek Shinde, it tells the story of the Kalki, the last Avatar of Vishnu, being created by an evil geneticist from the cloning of the remains of Rama. The first issue shipped in May of 2008.
