= Ojrzeń, Masovian Voivodeship =

Ojrzeń
- Village
- Location within Poland
- Coordinates: 52°46′6″N 20°32′41″E
- Country: Poland
- Voivodeship: Masovian
- County: Ciechanów
- Gmina: Ojrzeń
- Population: 750

Ojrzeń [ˈɔi̯ʐɛɲ] is a village in Ciechanów County, Masovian Voivodeship, in east-central Poland. It is the seat of the gmina (administrative district) called Gmina Ojrzeń.
