= Kalki, Maharashtra =

Village in Maharashtra

Kalki
- Village
- Interactive map of Kalki
- Country: India
- State: Maharashtra

Kalki is a small village in Ratnagiri district, Maharashtra state in Western India. The 2011 Census of India recorded a total of 641 residents in the village. Kalki's geographical area is 515 hectares (1,270 acres).
