= Julio Jorge Nelson =

Argentine tango musician (1913–1976)

- Born: Isaac Rosofsky; 27 April 1913; Buenos Aires, Argentina
- Died: 6 March 1976 (aged 62) Buenos Aires, Argentina
- Genres: Tango
- Occupation: Composer

Julio Jorge Nelson (born Isaac Rosofsky; 27 April 1913 – 6 March 1976) was a leading Argentine tango musician. He helped establish the cult of Carlos Gardel and wrote several tangos.

== Biography ==
Born in Buenos Aires into a Jewish family in 1913 as Isaac Rosofsky, he became famous as an adult with the pseudonym Julio Jorge Nelson.

Isaac, the son of a shoemaker, was raised in Villa Crespo. His childhood home was at 225 Triunvirato, later renumbered and renamed as 4943 Corrientes, opposite the theater Florencio Sánchez. Immersed since childhood in the theatrical environment and in the emerging world of radio, at fourteen he decided not to study further, a decision that earned him being thrown out of the house by his parents. He moved to El Centro area of Buenos Aires.

Linking his fate to that of Carlos Gardel began in 1933 when he was presented as a performance artist speaker at the Nacional theater. In 1934, Nelson began broadcasting his Buenos Aires radio program "Escuche esta Noche a Gardel" ("Listen tonight to Gardel"), trying to keep alive the public's interest in Gardel, who was killed on June 24, 1935 in an accidental airplane crash in Medellín.

Soon after, on Radio Callao, opened in January of that year, the announcer Carlos Enrique Cecchetti began broadcasting a program fully devoted to Gardel. Nelson continued that program beginning in 1936, inaugurating the show "El Bronce que Sonríe" ("The smiling bronze"). This program moved in 1944 to Radio Mitre. Each daily program started with this saying: "Through time and distance his name endures as the truest symbol of our arts. Carlos Gardel, the smiling bronze." Gardel's remains were returned from Colombia on 5 February 1936. Nelson broadcast a program from Gardel's gravesite in Chacarita Cemetery.

Another day radio program which gave Nelson great popularity was "El Exito de Cada Orquesta" (The Success of Every Orchestra), which was broadcast from Radio Callao (the station that also directed "La Pandilla Corazón") and then transferred to Radio Mitre and finally Radio Rivadavia. Knowing the value of ritual formulae, Nelson concluded each program with the same farewell: "See you tomorrow, if God permits." Both programs remained stubbornly on the air long after radio stations had started to thin out their tango programming.

In 1936, he married Margarita Ibarrola Isaurralde when she was 17, but they separated in 1945, leaving his 7-year-old son, Julio Carlos (nicknamed "Cachito") with the boy's paternal grandparents. Margarita migrated to Brazil, where she married a German and had two children with him but again separated. Eventually all contact was lost.

Julio then married Susana Carballo in 1951; she was a female tango singer known as Susana Ocampo. That marriage lasted only a year and half. They separated then, but no formal divorce. After Nelson's death, Susana became his heir.

One day, at age 14, Nelson's son escaped from the grandparents' house, leaving a letter in which he explained to them that he was going south. The truth was that he was going to Guayaquil, Ecuador with two friends. In Bolivia, they were arrested, but managed to continue traveling on a group passport. Nelson's son found employment at Club Barcelona. At that time, Tucho Méndez, a friend of Julio Jorge and aware of the disappearance of Julio's child, recognized his son with great surprise. He immediately phoned Buenos Aires, and shortly after, via a link to a radio Guayaquil, Julio, asked the son to come back home. His son returned.

Julio died on 6 March 1976, aged 62, four days after suffering a heart attack.

Julio Jorge Nelson wrote several tangos that enjoyed success. By far, the most successful was "Margarita Gauthier" with music by the talented Joaquín Mora. This tango was recorded by Alberto Gómez in 1935, but truly became famous due to the version of Miguel Caló with Raul Beron, in 1942, which was followed by Aníbal Troilo with Fiorentino, in 1943.

Nelson was also the author of the tangos "Carriego”, “Óyeme, mamá”, “Qué será de ti”, “No debemos retornar”, “Nocturno de tango”, “La casa vacía”, “Escuchando tu voz”, “Al volverte a ver”, “Junto al piano”, “Cuento azul”, and “Derrotao”, among others.

Nelson also had two forays into film, "Historia de un Ídolo" and "Soy del Tiempo de Gardel", about a time which he more than anyone else celebrated.
