= Ciechanów County =

Ciechanów County Powiat ciechanowski
- County
- Flag Coat of arms

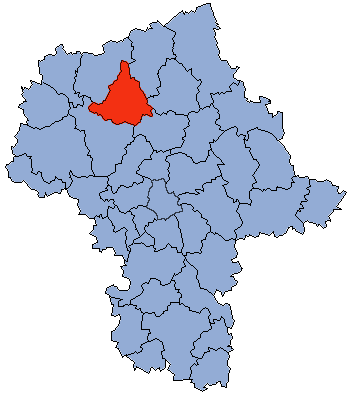
- Location within the voivodeship

- Division into gminas
- Coordinates (Ciechanów): 52°52′N 20°38′E
- Country: Poland
- Voivodeship: Masovian
- Seat: Ciechanów
- Gminas: Total 9 (incl. 1 urban): Ciechanów; Gmina Ciechanów; Gmina Glinojeck; Gmina Gołymin-Ośrodek; Gmina Grudusk; Gmina Ojrzeń; Gmina Opinogóra Górna; Gmina Regimin; Gmina Sońsk

Area
  - Total: 1,062.62 km^{2} (410.28 sq mi)

Population (2019)
  - Total: 89,460
  - Density: 84.19/km^{2} (218.0/sq mi)
  - Urban: 47,137
  - Rural: 42,323
- Car plates: WCI
- Website: www.ciechanow.powiat.pl

Ciechanów County (Polish: powiat ciechanowski) is a unit of territorial administration and local government (powiat) in Masovian Voivodeship, east-central Poland. It came into being on January 1, 1999, as a result of the Polish local government reforms passed in 1998. Its administrative seat and largest town is Ciechanów, which lies 77 kilometres (48 mi) north of Warsaw. The only other town in the county is Glinojeck, lying 25 km (16 mi) west of Ciechanów.

The county covers an area of 1,062.62 square kilometres (410.3 sq mi). As of 2019 its total population is 89,460, out of which the population of Ciechanów is 44,118, that of Glinojeck is 3,019, and the rural population is 42,323.

== Neighbouring counties ==
Ciechanów County is bordered by Mława County to the north, Przasnysz County to the north-east, Maków County and Pułtusk County to the east, and Płońsk County to the south.

== Administrative divisions ==
The county is subdivided into nine gminas (one urban, one urban-rural and seven rural). These are listed in the following table, in descending order of population.

Gmina	Type	Area (km^{2})	Population (2019)	Seat
Ciechanów	urban	32.5	44,118	
Gmina Glinojeck	urban-rural	153.5	7,864	Glinojeck
Gmina Sońsk	rural	155.0	7,748	Sońsk
Gmina Ciechanów	rural	140.2	7,090	Ciechanów *
Gmina Opinogóra Górna	rural	139.8	5,953	Opinogóra Górna
Gmina Regimin	rural	111.3	5,018	Regimin
Gmina Ojrzeń	rural	123.1	4,288	Ojrzeń
Gmina Gołymin-Ośrodek	rural	110.6	3,777	Gołymin-Ośrodek
Gmina Grudusk	rural	96.7	3,604	Grudusk
* seat not part of the gmina
