= Chrzanowski =

Chrzanowski (pronounced [xʂaˈnɔfskʲi]; feminine: Chrzanowska; plural: Chrzanowscy) is a Polish-language surname. Notable people with the surname include:

- Adam Chrzanowski (born 1999), Polish footballer
- Anna Dorota Chrzanowska (fl. 1675), Polish heroine of the Polish–Ottoman War
- Bernard Chrzanowski (1861–1944), Polish activist and politician
- Elżbieta Chrzanowska-Kluczewska (born 1953), English scholar
- Hanna Helena Chrzanowska (1902–1973), Polish Roman Catholic nun and nurse
- Ignacy Chrzanowski (1866–1940), Polish literary historian and Holocaust victim
- Jan Samuel Chrzanowski (died 1688), Polish military officer
- Katarzyna Chrzanowska (born 1963), Polish actress
- Kazimierz Chrzanowski (born 1951), Polish politician
- Mary Chrzanowski, American judge, lawyer and television host
- Sławomir Chrzanowski (born 1969), Polish cyclist
- Tadeusz Chrzanowski (1926–2006), art historian
- Tomasz Chrzanowski (born 1980), Polish speedway rider
- Wiesław Chrzanowski (1923–2012), Polish lawyer and politician
- Wojciech Chrzanowski (1793–1861), Polish military officer

== See also ==
- Chrzanów (disambiguation)
- Chrzanówek
- Chrzanowice (disambiguation)
- Chrzanowo (disambiguation)
- Khrzhanovsky
