= Chrzanowice =

Chrzanowice may refer to:

- Chrzanowice, Radomsko County
- Chrzanowice, Sieradz County
- Kolonia Chrzanowice

== See also ==
- Chrzan
- Chrzanów (disambiguation)
- Chrzanowo (disambiguation)
- Chrzanowski
