= Opinogóra =

Opinogóra may refer to:

- Opinogóra Górna
- Opinogóra Dolna
- Opinogóra-Kolonia
- Gmina Opinogóra Górna
