= Sosnovsky Urban Settlement =

Sosnovsky Urban Settlement or Sosnovskoye Urban Settlement is the name of several municipal formations in Russia.

- Sosnovsky Urban Settlement, a municipal formation which Sosnovsky Settlement Council in Sosnovsky District of Tambov Oblast is incorporated as
- Sosnovskoye Urban Settlement, a municipal formation which the Town of Sosnovka in Vyatskopolyansky District of Kirov Oblast is incorporated as
- Sosnovskoye Urban Settlement, a municipal formation which the Work Settlement of Sosnovskoye in Sosnovsky District of Nizhny Novgorod Oblast is incorporated as

== See also ==
- Sosnovsky (disambiguation)
