= Sosnovsky District =

Location of Chelyabinsk Oblast in Russia

Location of Nizhny Novgorod Oblast in Russia

Location of Tambov Oblast in Russia

Sosnovsky District is the name of several administrative and municipal districts in Russia. The name is generally derived from or is related to the root "sosna" ("pine").

== Districts ==
- Sosnovsky District, Chelyabinsk Oblast, an administrative and municipal district of Chelyabinsk Oblast
- Sosnovsky District, Nizhny Novgorod Oblast, an administrative and municipal district of Nizhny Novgorod Oblast
- Sosnovsky District, Tambov Oblast, an administrative and municipal district of Tambov Oblast

== Former districts ==
- Sosnovsky District, Leningrad Oblast, an administrative district of Leningrad Oblast between 1948 and 1960, previously known as Rautovsky District.

== See also ==
- Sosnovsky (disambiguation)
