= Morshansky =

Morshansky (masculine), Morshanskaya (feminine), or Morshanskoye (neuter) may refer to:

- Morshansky District, a district of Tambov Oblast, Russia
- Morshanskoye, a rural locality (a settlement) in Kaliningrad Oblast, Russia
