= Wielki Bór =

Wielki Bór may refer to the following places:

- Wielki Bór, Greater Poland Voivodeship (west-central Poland)
- Wielki Bór, Łódź Voivodeship (central Poland)
- Wielki Bór, Podlaskie Voivodeship (north-east Poland)
