= Sosnovsky =

Sosnovsky (masculine), Sosnovskaya (feminine), or Sosnovskoye (neuter) may refer to:

People

- Vladimir Sosnovsky (1922–1990), Ukrainian artist
- Sergey Sosnovski (b. 1981), Belarusian association football player
- Sergey Sosnovsky (1955–2022), Russian actor
- Adrian Sosnovschi (b. 1977), Moldovan association football player

Places

- Sosnovsky District, several districts in Russia
- Sosnovsky Urban Settlement (or Sosnovskoye Urban Settlement), several municipal urban settlements in Russia
- Sosnovsky (inhabited locality) (Sosnovskaya, Sosnovskoye), several inhabited localities in Russia

Plants

- Heracleum sosnowskyi or Sosnowskyi Hogweed, a flowering plant in the family Apiaceae

== See also ==
- Sosnovo
- Sosnovka
