= Pomorze (disambiguation) =

Pomorze is the Polish name for Pomerania (taken to include Pomerelia). It is also the alternative name for the Pomeranian Voivodeship.

Pomorze may also refer to the following villages:

- Pomorze, Masovian Voivodeship (east-central Poland)
- Pomorze, Podlaskie Voivodeship (east Poland)
