= Sosnowo =

Sosnowo may refer to the following places:

- Sosnowo, Gmina Bargłów Kościelny, Podlaskie Voivodeship, Poland
- Sosnowo, Gmina Sztabin, Podlaskie Voivodeship, Poland
- Sosnowo, Gryfino County, West Pomeranian Voivodeship, Poland
- Sosnowo, Kuyavian-Pomeranian Voivodeship, Poland
- Sosnowo, Łobez County, West Pomeranian Voivodeship, Poland
- Sosnowo, Masovian Voivodeship, Poland

== See also ==
- Sosnowo Lock, the second lock on the Augustów Canal, Podlaskie Voivodeship, Poland
- Sosnovo, the name of several rural localities in Russia
