= Bogucin =

Bogucin may refer to the following places in Poland:

- Bogucin, Lower Silesian Voivodeship (south-west Poland)
- Bogucin, Kuyavian-Pomeranian Voivodeship (north-central Poland)
- Bogucin, Lublin Voivodeship (east Poland)
- Bogucin, Ciechanów County in Masovian Voivodeship (north-central Poland)
- Bogucin, Kozienice County in Masovian Voivodeship (east-central Poland)
- Bogucin, Płońsk County in Masovian Voivodeship (north-central Poland)
- Bogucin, Greater Poland Voivodeship (west-central Poland)
- Bogucin Duży in administrative district of Gmina Klucze, within Olkusz County, Lesser Poland Voivodeship (southern Poland)
- Bogucin Mały in administrative district of Gmina Olkusz, within Olkusz County, Lesser Poland Voivodeship (southern Poland)

== See also ==
- Bogucino
