= Rąbież =

Rąbież may refer to the following places:

- Rąbież, Ciechanów County in Masovian Voivodeship (east-central Poland)
- Rąbież, Płońsk County in Masovian Voivodeship (east-central Poland)
- Rąbież, Gmina Korytnica in Masovian Voivodeship (east-central Poland)
- Rąbież, Gmina Wierzbno in Masovian Voivodeship (east-central Poland)

== See also ==
- Rąbież Gruduski in Masovian Voivodeship (east-central Poland)
