= Sosnovo =

Sosnovo (Russian: Сосново) is the name of several rural localities in Russia:

- Sosnovo, Chelyabinsk Oblast, a village in Alabugsky Selsoviet of Krasnoarmeysky District of Chelyabinsk Oblast
- Sosnovo, Chuvash Republic, a village in Atnarskoye Rural Settlement of Krasnochetaysky District of the Chuvash Republic
- Sosnovo, Ivanovo Oblast, a village in Teykovsky District of Ivanovo Oblast
- Sosnovo, Sanchursky District, Kirov Oblast, a village in Gorodishchensky Rural Okrug of Sanchursky District of Kirov Oblast
- Sosnovo, Uninsky District, Kirov Oblast, a village in Sosnovsky Rural Okrug of Uninsky District of Kirov Oblast
- Sosnovo, Kurgan Oblast, a village in Myrkaysky Selsoviet of Mishkinsky District of Kurgan Oblast
- Sosnovo, Priozersky District, Leningrad Oblast, a logging depot settlement in Sosnovskoye Settlement Municipal Formation of Priozersky District of Leningrad Oblast
- Sosnovo, Volosovsky District, Leningrad Oblast, a village in Izvarskoye Settlement Municipal Formation of Volosovsky District of Leningrad Oblast
- Sosnovo, Novgorod Oblast, a village in Poddorskoye Settlement of Poddorsky District of Novgorod Oblast
- Sosnovo, Perm Krai, a selo under the administrative jurisdiction of the town of krai significance of Chaykovsky, Perm Krai
- Sosnovo, Loknyansky District, Pskov Oblast, a village in Loknyansky District, Pskov Oblast
- Sosnovo, Porkhovsky District, Pskov Oblast, a village in Porkhovsky District, Pskov Oblast
- Sosnovo, Republic of Tatarstan, a selo in Agryzsky District of the Republic of Tatarstan
- Sosnovo, Tver Oblast, a village in Ostashkovsky District of Tver Oblast

== See also ==
- Sosnovsky (disambiguation)
- Sosnowo (disambiguation)
