= Aleksey Polosin =

Soviet Red Army sergeant (1924–1943)

Aleksey Ivanovich Polosin
- Алексей Иванович Полосин
- Born: 1924; Kazinka village, Sosnovsky District, Tambov Oblast, RSFSR, Soviet Union
- Died: 15 October 1943 (aged 18–19); Medwin village, Ivankiv Raion, Kiev Oblast, Ukrainian SSR
- Military career
- Allegiance: Soviet Union
- Branch: Red Army
- Service years: 1942–1943
- Rank: Junior sergeant
- Unit: 3rd Guards Airborne Division
- Conflicts: World War II
- Awards: Hero of the Soviet Union

Aleksey Ivanovich Polosin (Russian: Алексей Иванович Полосин; 1924 – 15 October 1943) was a Red Army sergeant, who was posthumously a Hero of the Soviet Union. He was posthumously awarded the title for his actions in the Battle of the Dnieper. Polosin was reported to have killed three German officers during a reconnaissance mission and 26 soldiers while repulsing a German counterattack.

== Early life ==
Polosin was born in 1924 in Kazinka village, Sosnovsky District, Tambov Oblast to a peasant family. In 1932, the family moved to Vishnevka village in Morshansky District. After completing his education, Polosin became an accountant on the kolkhoz. He simultaneously worked as a freelance journalist for the regional newspaper. In April 1941, he was hired by the district printer. At the beginning of World War II, he was transferred to the editorial staff, working as a journalist.

== World War II ==
In August 1942, Polosin was drafted into the Red Army. He graduated from a school of junior commanders with the rank of junior sergeant, and fought in combat from 1943, becoming a squad leader in the 7th Company of the 2nd Guards Airborne Regiment of the 3rd Guards Airborne Division.

In September 1943, the division crossed the Desna River and advanced to the Dnieper. In the Battle of the Dnieper, the division fought hard to expand the bridgehead on the right bank near Strakholesye. On 2 October, Polosin, as part of the reconnaissance platoon, was reported by his superiors to have broken into the German headquarters, killing a German major and two captains, and capturing documents. Polosin reportedly caused confusion among the German troops, allowing the advance of the division. During the German counterattack, he covered the battalion's flank and reportedly killed 26 German soldiers. On 15 October, he was killed in battle in the village of Medwin.

Polosin was posthumously awarded the title Hero of the Soviet Union and the Order of Lenin on 10 January 1944.

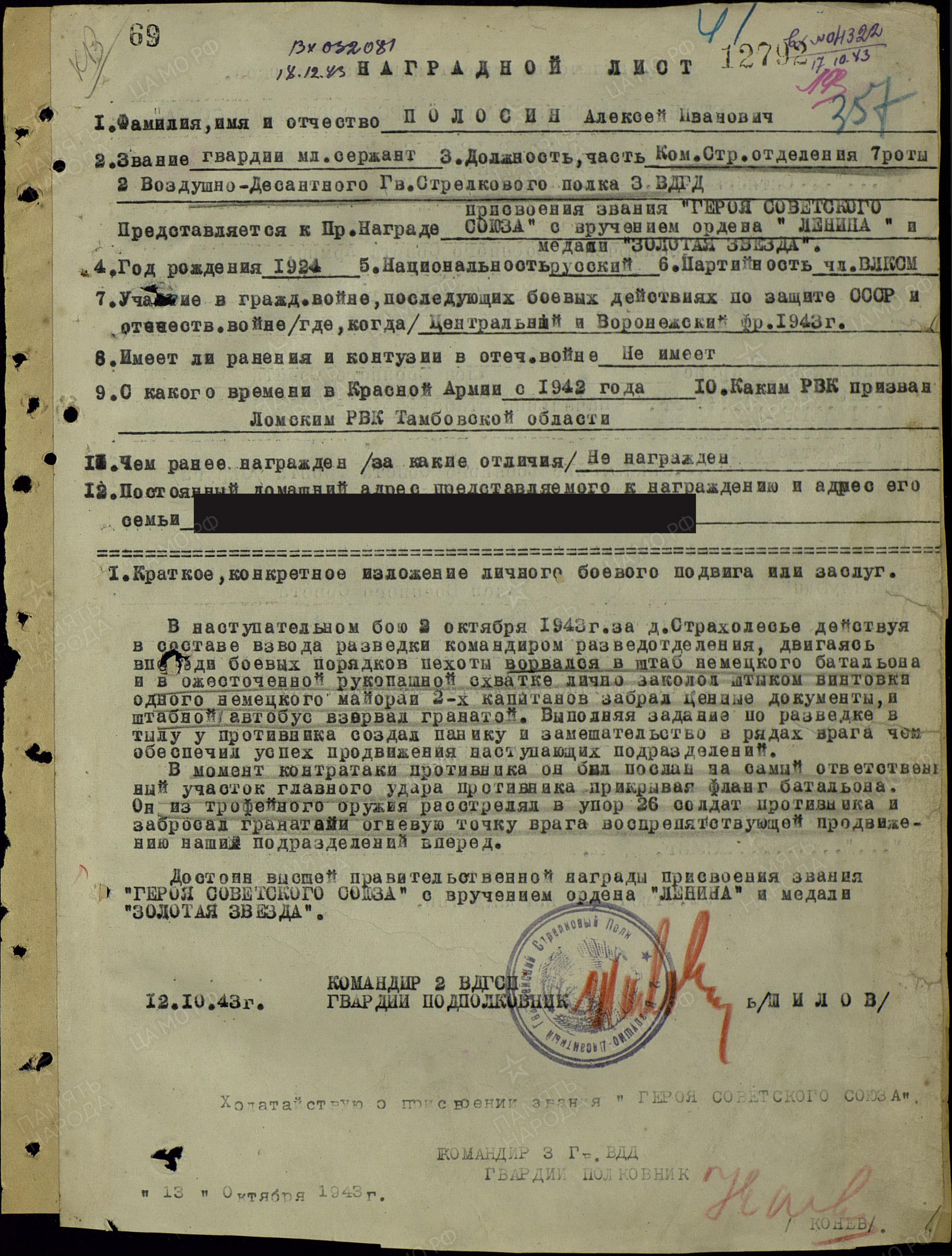
Recommendation for the award of the title Hero of the Soviet Union to Polosin

Hero of the Soviet Union citation

In the offensive battle for the village of Strakholesye on 2 October 1943, as a squad leader of a reconnaissance platoon moving ahead of the infantry, [he] burst into a German battalion headquarters and in a fierce hand-to-hand fight singlehandedly bayoneted a German major and two captains, retrieved valuable documents, and blew up a staff car with a grenade. Completing the reconnaissance mission in the enemy rear, he sowed panic and confusion in the enemy ranks, ensuring the success of the advancing units. When the enemy counterattacked, he was sent to the most critical section of the main blow of the enemy, covering the flank of the battalion. He shot 26 enemy soldiers at point blank range with a captured weapon and threw grenades at the enemy firing position impeding the advance of our units.
