= Sosnovsky (inhabited locality) =

Sosnovsky (Russian: Сосно́вский; masculine), Sosnovskaya (Сосно́вская; feminine), or Sosnovskoye (Сосно́вское; neuter) is the name of several inhabited localities in Russia.

Urban localities

- Sosnovskoye, Sosnovsky District, Nizhny Novgorod Oblast, a work settlement in Sosnovsky District of Nizhny Novgorod Oblast

Rural localities

- Sosnovsky, Irkutsk Oblast, a settlement in Kuytunsky District of Irkutsk Oblast
- Sosnovsky, Samara Oblast, a settlement in Kinelsky District of Samara Oblast
- Sosnovsky, Voronezh Oblast, a settlement in Novopokrovskoye Rural Settlement of Novokhopyorsky District of Voronezh Oblast
- Sosnovskoye, Bryansk Oblast, a village in Saltanovsky Selsoviet of Navlinsky District of Bryansk Oblast
- Sosnovskoye, Kurgan Oblast, a selo in Sosnovsky Selsoviet of Shadrinsky District of Kurgan Oblast
- Sosnovskoye, Nikolo-Pogostinsky Selsoviet, Gorodetsky District, Nizhny Novgorod Oblast, a village in Nikolo-Pogostinsky Selsoviet of Gorodetsky District of Nizhny Novgorod Oblast
- Sosnovskoye, Zinyakovsky Selsoviet, Gorodetsky District, Nizhny Novgorod Oblast, a village in Zinyakovsky Selsoviet of Gorodetsky District of Nizhny Novgorod Oblast
- Sosnovskoye, Omsk Oblast, a selo in Sosnovsky Rural Okrug of Tavrichesky District of Omsk Oblast
