= Kosówka =

Kosówka may refer to the following places:

- Kosówka, Łódź Voivodeship (central Poland)
- Kosówka, Podlaskie Voivodeship (north-east Poland)
- Kosówka, Subcarpathian Voivodeship (south-east Poland)
