= Wójcik-Fryszerka =

- Settlement
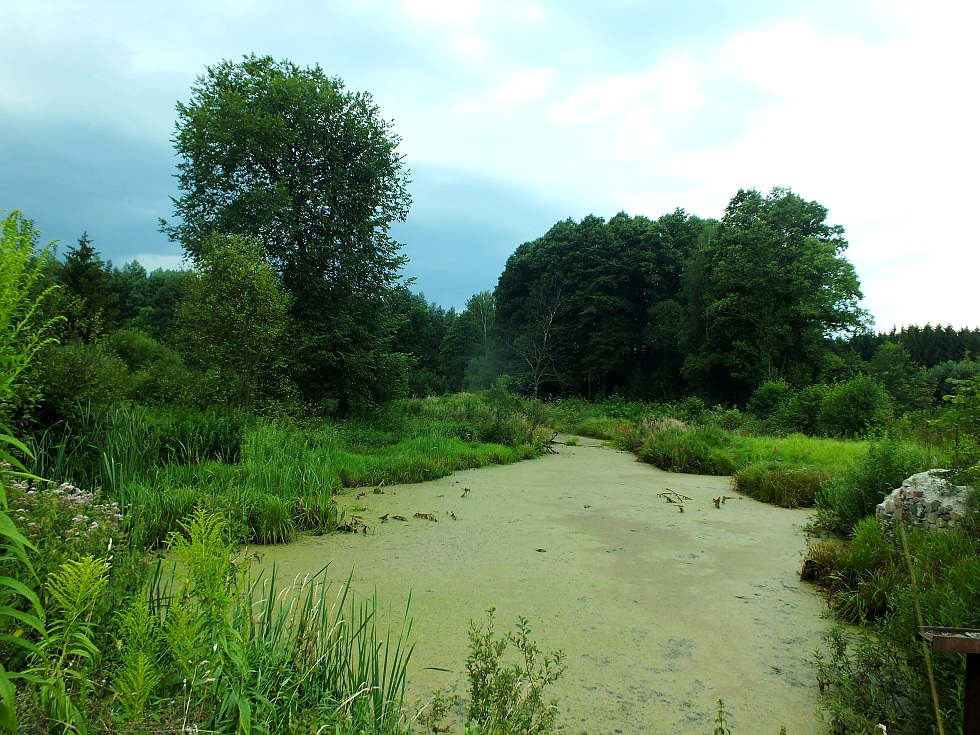

- Location within Poland
- Coordinates: 51°09′02″N 19°28′57″E
- Country: Poland
- Voivodeship: Łódź
- County: Radomsko
- Gmina: Gomunice

Wójcik-Fryszerka [ˈvui̯t͡ɕik frɨˈʂɛrka] is a settlement in the administrative district of Gmina Gomunice, within Radomsko County, Łódź Voivodeship, in central Poland.

== See also ==
- Fryszerka, Opoczno County
- Wójcik, about the name
