= Zofia Gołubiew =

Art historian (1942–2022)

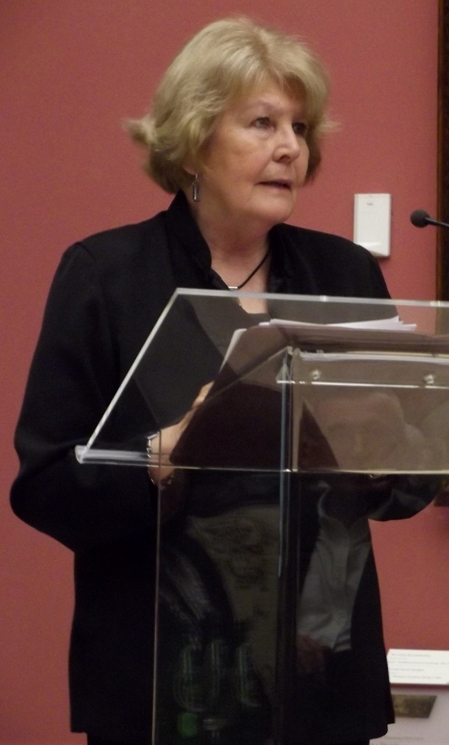
- Zofia Gołubiew, 2013
- Born: 20 April 1942
- Died: 2022 (aged 79–80)
- Occupation: Art historian
- Known for: Director of the National Museum in Kraków

Zofia Gołubiew née Oleś (20 April 1942 – 2022) was an art historian and museologist, director of the National Museum in Kraków from 2000 to 2015.

== Biography ==
Her mother was a Polish teacher. She graduated in art history from the Jagiellonian University in 1972. After the studies she worked at the PWM Edition. In 1974, at the invitation of Zdzisław Żygulski, she started work at the National Museum in Kraków, as an editor for the Museum’s publishing house.

== Awards and honors ==
- Knight's Cross of the Order of Polonia Restituta (1999)
- Gold Gloria Artis Medal for Merit to Culture (2005)
- Commander's Cross of the Order of Polonia Restituta (2011)
- Laurel of Kraków of the 21st century (2015)
