= Paciorkowizna =

- Settlement
- Location within Poland
- Coordinates: 51°10′36″N 19°28′54″E
- Country: Poland
- Voivodeship: Łódź
- County: Radomsko
- Gmina: Gomunice

Paciorkowizna [pat͡ɕɔrkɔˈvizna] is a settlement in the administrative district of Gmina Gomunice, within Radomsko County, Łódź Voivodeship, in central Poland.
