= Laurel of Kraków of the 21st century =

Award presented from 2001 until 2016

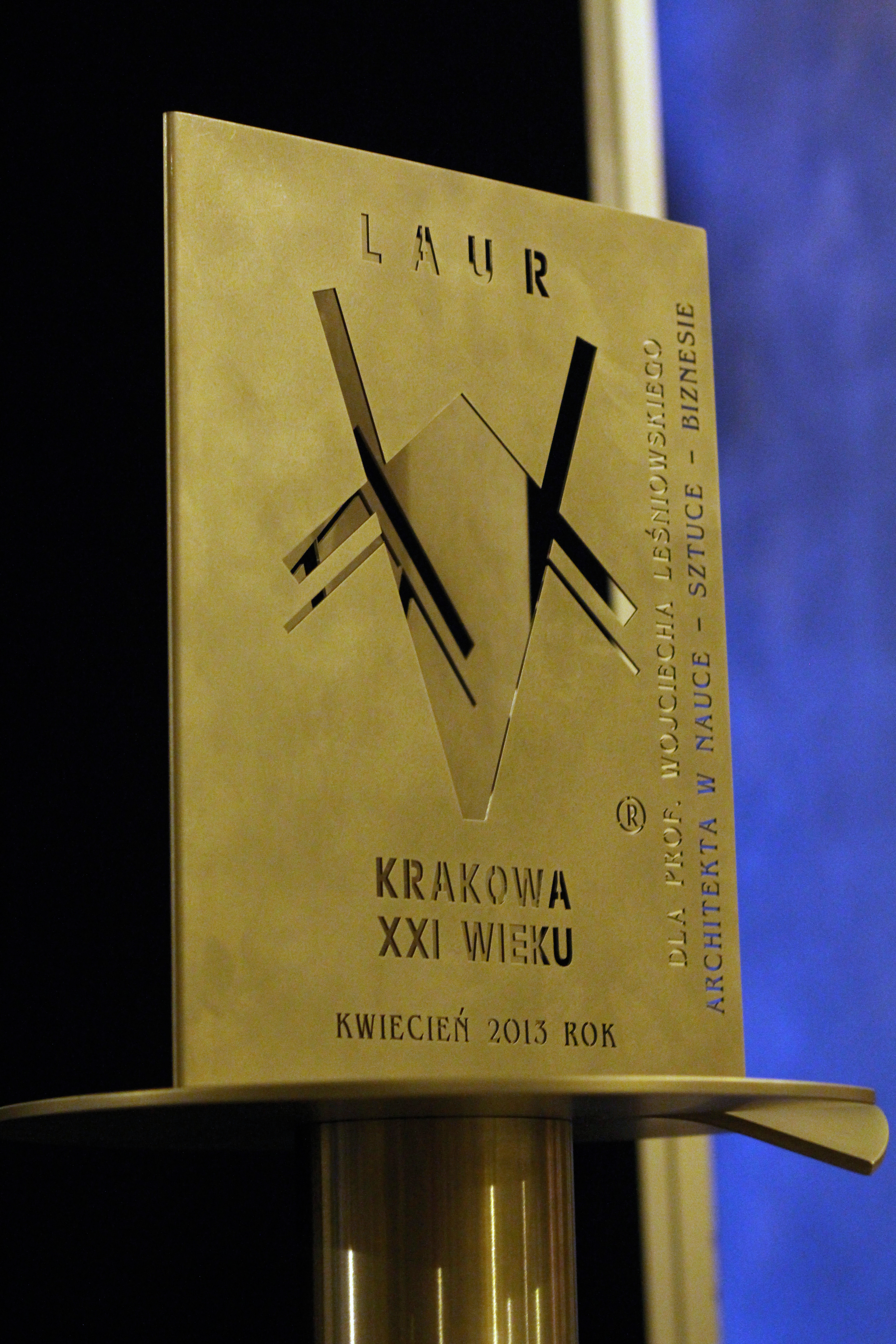
- Laur Krakowa statue, 2016
- Native name: Laur Krakowa XXI wieku
- Awarded for: services to the city, successfully combining science, art and business in its activities
- Date: 2001–2007; 2013–2016
- Country: Poland
- Presented by: Anna Zabdyr-Jamróz, Jacek Majchrowski
- First award: Krystyna Styrna-Bartkowicz
- Final award: Krzysztof Penderecki

Laurel of Kraków of the 21st century was an award presented from 2001 until 2016 to people who have made particularly significant contributions to the city of Kraków and who successfully combined science, art and business in their activities.

The chairperson of the jury responsible for selecting the laureate was architect Anna Zabdyr-Jamróz. The jury members included: Beata Kupczyk, Joanna Cicio, Stefan Dousa, Adriana Gawriłow, Zuzanna Grabowska, Jan Kurek, Marek Piwowarczyk, Tadeusz Przemysław Szafer (2001–2017), Jerzy Vetulani (2001–2017), and Benedykt Zygadło.

== Awarded ==
- 2001: Krystyna Styrna-Bartkowicz
- 2002: Tadeusz Chrzanowski
- 2003: Zbigniew Witek
- 2004: Jerzy Wyrozumski
- 2005: Jan Kanty Pawluśkiewicz
- 2006: Jerzy Stuhr
- 2007: Leon Knabit
- 2013: Wojciech Leśnikowski
- 2014: Tadeusz Pieronek
- 2015: Zofia Gołubiew
- 2016: Krzysztof Penderecki
