= Gomunice =

- Village
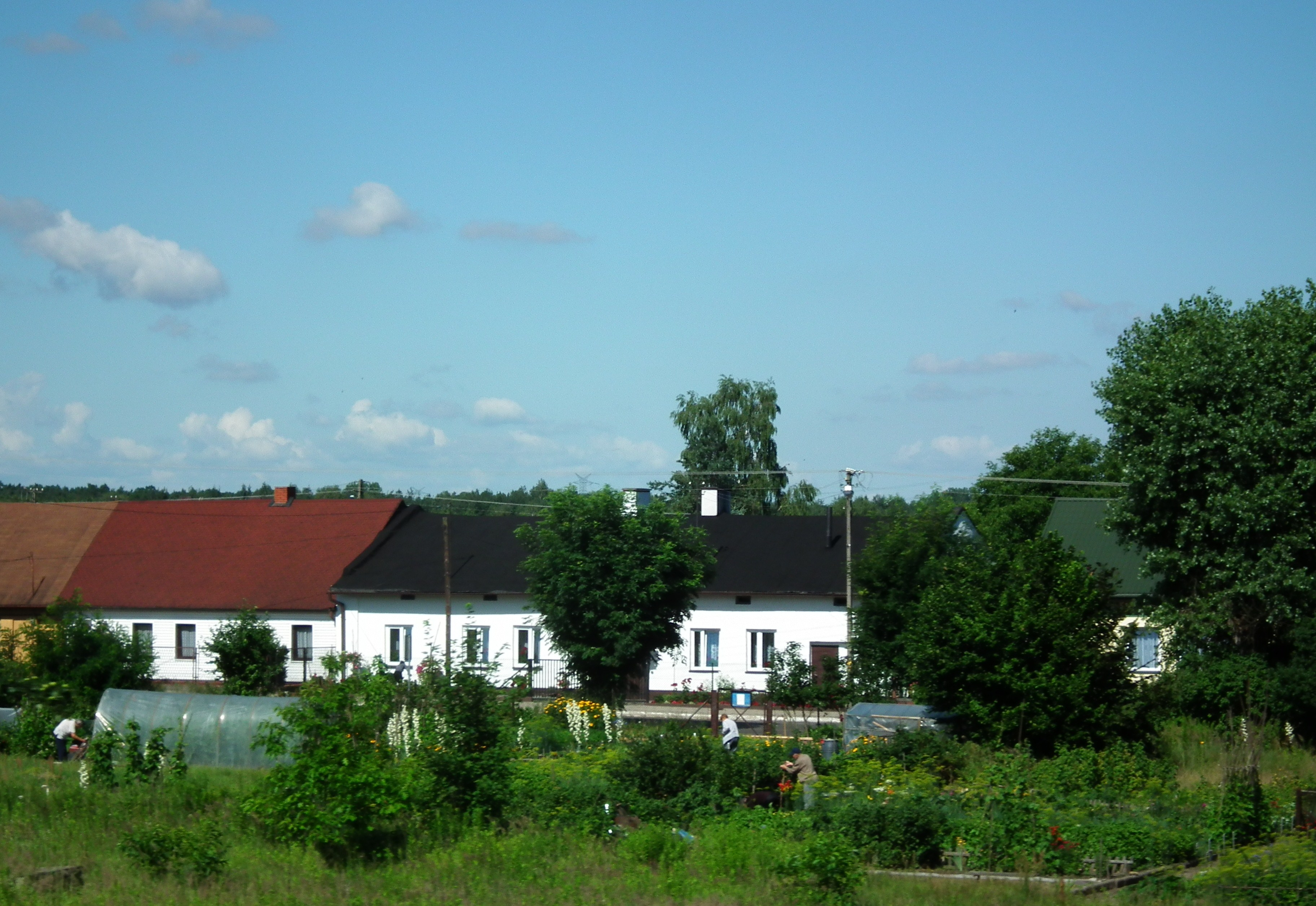

- Location within Poland
- Coordinates: 51°10′N 19°29′E
- Country: Poland
- Voivodeship: Łódź
- County: Radomsko
- Gmina: Gomunice
- Population: 1,900

Gomunice [ɡɔmuˈnit͡sɛ] is a village in Radomsko County, Łódź Voivodeship, in central Poland. It is the seat of the gmina (administrative district) called Gmina Gomunice.
