= Piaszczyce =

- Village
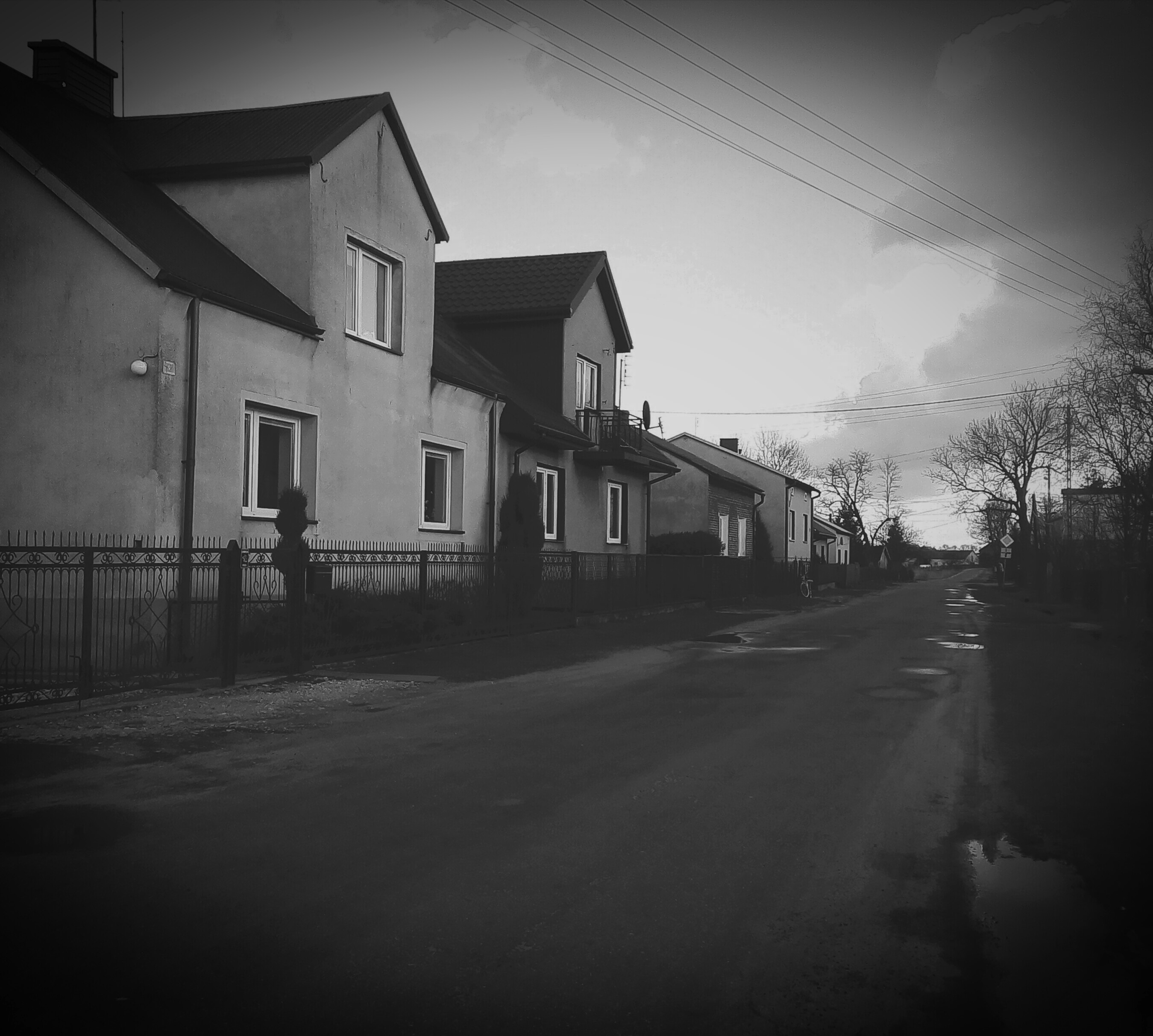

- Location within Poland
- Coordinates: 51°7′N 19°32′E
- Country: Poland
- Voivodeship: Łódź
- County: Radomsko
- Gmina: Gomunice
- Elevation: 208 m (682 ft)
- Population: 302 (2,011)

Piaszczyce [pjaʂˈt͡ʂɨt͡sɛ] is a village in the administrative district of Gmina Gomunice, within Radomsko County, Łódź Voivodeship, in central Poland.
