= Dzbonie =

- Village
- Location within Poland
- Coordinates: 52°56′N 20°42′E
- Country: Poland
- Voivodeship: Masovian
- County: Ciechanów
- Gmina: Opinogóra Górna

Dzbonie [ˈd͡zbɔɲɛ] is a village in the administrative district of Gmina Opinogóra Górna, within Ciechanów County, Masovian Voivodeship, in east-central Poland.
