= Khrzhanovsky =

Khrzhanovsky/Khrzhanovskiy (Russian: Хржано́вский, pronounced [xrʐɐˈnofskʲɪj]; masculine) or Khrzhanovskaya (Хржано́вская; feminine) is a Russian surname of Polish origin. People with the last name include:

- Andrei Khrzhanovsky (born 1939), Russian animator and filmmaker
- Andrey Khrzhanovskiy (born 1998), known as Andrey X, Russian-Israeli journalist and activist
- Ilya Khrzhanovsky (born 1975), Russian filmmaker
- Olga Khrzhanovskaya (born 1980), Russian volleyball player

== See also ==
- Chrzanowski
