= Pirowy =

- Settlement
- Location within Poland
- Coordinates: 51°11′01″N 19°31′25″E
- Country: Poland
- Voivodeship: Łódź
- County: Radomsko
- Gmina: Gomunice

Pirowy [piˈrɔvɨ] is a settlement in the administrative district of Gmina Gomunice, within Radomsko County, Łódź Voivodeship, in central Poland.
