= Przytoka, Ciechanów County =

Przytoka
- Village
- Location within Poland
- Coordinates: 52°52′37″N 20°46′10″E
- Country: Poland
- Voivodeship: Masovian
- County: Ciechanów
- Gmina: Opinogóra Górna

Przytoka [pʂɨˈtɔka] is a village in the administrative district of Gmina Opinogóra Górna, within Ciechanów County, Masovian Voivodeship, in east-central Poland.
