= Karkoszki, Radomsko County =

Karkoszki
- Village
- Location within Poland
- Coordinates: 51°8′28″N 19°28′36″E
- Country: Poland
- Voivodeship: Łódź
- County: Radomsko
- Gmina: Gomunice

Karkoszki [karˈkɔʂki] is a village in the administrative district of Gmina Gomunice, within Radomsko County, Łódź Voivodeship, in central Poland.
