= Wojciech Leśnikowski =

American architect

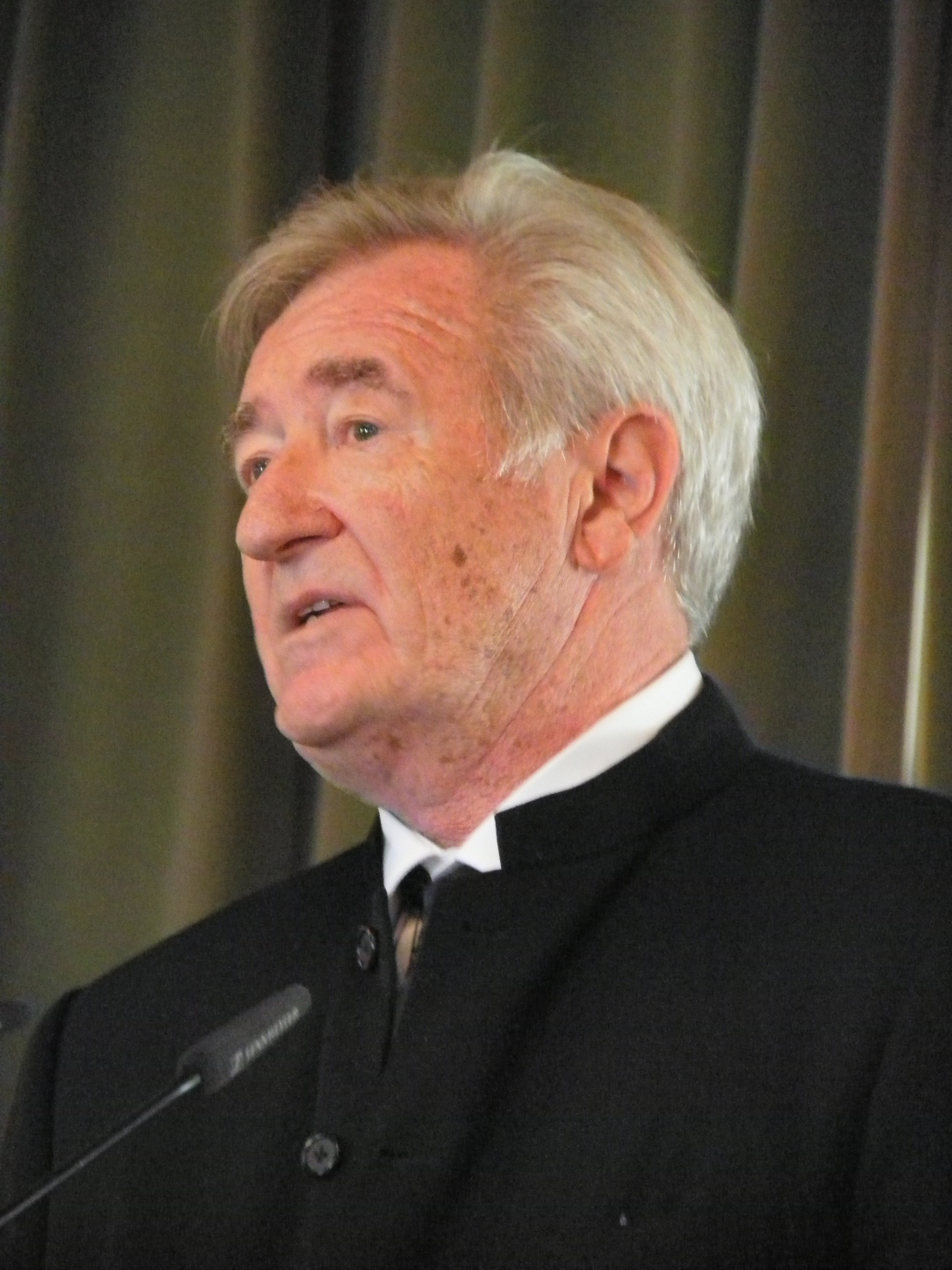
- Leśnikowski in 2013, giving a speech during the Laurel of Kraków of the 21st century ceremony
- Born: Wojciech Grzegorz Leśnikowski; May 9, 1938; Lublin, Poland
- Died: April 17, 2014 (aged 75); Lawrence, Kansas, United States
- Education: Tadeusz Kościuszko Kraków University of Technology
- Occupation: Architect
- Awards: Ordre des Arts et des Lettres (1990), Laurel of Kraków of the 21st century (2013)

Wojciech Grzegorz Leśnikowski (May 9, 1938 – April 17, 2014), was a Polish-American architect, writer and educator. He oversaw and participated in the design and construction of numerous large-scale architectural projects around the world.

== Career ==
Wojciech G. Leśnikowski passed the maturity exam in 1955, in the I Liceum Ogólnokształcące im. Mikołaja Kopernika in Bielsko-Biała. Leśnikowski received his Masters of Architecture and Urban Planning from the Tadeusz Kościuszko Kraków University of Technology, School of Architecture and Urban Planning in 1961. He worked in Kraków, Poland, for a few years, then in 1964 he left for Paris for an internship with the famed architect Le Corbusier. He worked for Pierre Vago and Jean Renaudie, as well as Le Corbusier, while in Paris. He began teaching at the L'Ecole des Beaux-Arts in 1967. He went to America in 1969, worked as an architect in Chicago and continued to teach at numerous prestigious institutions. He was a chief architect at HNTB, Loebl Schlossman & Hackl, and HOK Corporation. He served as the lead designer of a hospital and a skyscraper – the iconic red CNA Center.

He became a distinguished professor at The University of Kansas in 1988. In 1990, he became a Knight of the Order of Arts and Letters in France. In 2013 he became the eighth person to receive a Laurel of Kraków of the 21st century. He has created numerous architectural projects such as housing estates, public buildings, airports, hospitals and skyscrapers in Poland, France, the United States, New Zealand, China, Japan and Italy.

=== Teaching ===
- 1967–69: L'Ecole des Beaux-Arts
- 1969–72: Yale University
- 1972–78: Cornell University
- 1975–79: University of Pennsylvania
- 1981–88: University of Illinois Chicago
- 1981―88: University of Wisconsin–Milwaukee
- 1989–2014: University of Kansas – Distinguished Don Hatch Professor

=== Writing ===
- 1982: Romanticism and Rationalism in Architecture
- 1990: The New French Architecture
- 1993: Many Faces of German Modernism
- 1994: Modernism in Czechoslovakian, Hungarian and Polish Architecture 1919–39
- 1994: Architecture of Germany between Two World Wars
- Numerous articles published in the US, UK, France, Italy, Germany, Switzerland, Netherlands, and Poland

=== Awards ===
- 1977: Fulbright International Award
- 1981, 1983, 1989: Graham Foundation Grant
- 1989: Fulbright Grant
- 1990: Chevalier de L'Ordre des Arts et des Lettres of the French Republic
- 1991–1992: National endowment for Humanities Grant
- 1992: German Academy of Science Grant
- 2013: Kraków Laurel Award

== Architectural philosophy ==
Teaching and research interests

- Architectural design: large-scale buildings, current high-tech, future technologies, experimental architecture
- Architectural history theories
- Aesthetics of modern architecture
- Architecture as industrial art
- Corporate practice in contemporary architecture

Areas of expertise

- Advanced architectural design – large-scale buildings, cutting-edge technologies
- Architectural history and theories of architecture
- Architectural publications
- European current architecture and practice
- International airport and skyscraper design

== Personal life ==
=== Family ===
Wojciech Leśnikowski was the son of Roman and Irena, born in 1938, one year before the German invasion of Poland. In pre-World War II Poland, his father was a soldier, a lawyer and a politician. His mother was Jewish, so when the Nazis arrived, his father hid the family on the rural property of one of his business clients. His father fought on the side of the Soviet Union later in the war, and was sent to Kraków as a government administrator after it was over. In 1948, when rulers found out about his father's anti-communist sympathies, the authorities came to the Leśnikowski home on Wojciech's 10th birthday. He did not see his father again until 1953, when he was released from a Soviet Gulag following the death of Joseph Stalin. His parents survived the war, but many of his family members did not. Wojciech married a fellow architect and educator Rebecca James in 1987. On July 22, 1995, he became a single parent to his two young daughters, when his wife died in a horse-riding accident in Poland. He later married Julie Lesnikowski, owner of Jordan Ross Designs in Lawrence, Kansas.

=== Death ===
He died on April 17, 2014, from brain cancer.

== Works ==
- Airport, Kraków
- Airport, Warsaw
- Airport, Warsaw
- Cathedral, Warsaw
- Government Center, Taiwan
- Hospital, Chicago
- Library, Osaka, Japan
- Museum of Aviation, Kraków
- Office Complex, Taiwan
- Office Building, Chicago
- Office Building, Chicago
- Opera House, St. Louis
- Skyscraper, Hong Kong
- Skyscraper, New York
- Technology Center, Shanghai, China
- Skyscraper, Warsaw, Poland
- Terminal for Modlin Airport, Poland
- Terminal for KC Airport, Missouri
- Terminal for Katowice Airport, Poland
- Concert Hall for Kansas City, Missouri
- Terminal for Kraków Airport, Poland
- Terminal for Kansas City Airport, Missouri
- New Crystalline Generic Terminal
