= Gmina Gomunice =

Gmina Gomunice Gomunice Commune
- Gmina
- Municipal office
- Interactive map of Gmina Gomunice
- Coordinates (Gomunice): 51°10′N 19°29′E
- Country: Poland
- Voivodeship: Łódź
- County: Radomsko
- Seat: Gomunice

Area
  - Total: 62.57 km^{2} (24.16 sq mi)

Population (2006)
  - Total: 5,966
  - Density: 95.35/km^{2} (247.0/sq mi)
- Time zone: UTC+1 (CET)
  - Summer (DST): UTC+2 (CEST)
- Website: www.gomunice.pl

Gmina Gomunice is a rural gmina (administrative district) in Radomsko County, Łódź Voivodeship, in central Poland. Its seat is the village of Gomunice, which lies approximately 12 kilometres (7 mi) north of Radomsko and 69 km (43 mi) south of the regional capital Łódź.

The gmina covers an area of 62.57 square kilometres (24.2 sq mi), and as of 2006 its total population is 5,966.

== Villages ==
Gmina Gomunice contains the villages and settlements of:

- Borowiecko-Kolonia
- Chruścin
- Chrzanowice
- Gertrudów
- Gomunice
- Hucisko
- Karkoszki
- Kletnia
- Kletnia-Kolonia
- Kocierzowy
- Kolonia Chrzanowice
- Kolonia Piaszczyce
- Kosówka
- Marianka
- Paciorkowizna
- Piaszczyce
- Pirowy
- Pudzików
- Słostowice
- Wąglin
- Wielki Bór
- Wojciechów
- Wójcik-Fryszerka
- Zygmuntów

== Neighbouring gminas ==
Gmina Gomunice is bordered by the gminas of Dobryszyce, Gorzkowice, Kamieńsk, Kodrąb and Radomsko.
