= Zygmuntów, Radomsko County =

Zygmuntów
- Settlement
- Location within Poland
- Coordinates: 51°9′57″N 19°33′48″E
- Country: Poland
- Voivodeship: Łódź
- County: Radomsko
- Gmina: Gomunice

Zygmuntów [zɨɡˈmuntuf] is a settlement in the administrative district of Gmina Gomunice, within Radomsko County, Łódź Voivodeship, in central Poland.
