= Czernice, Masovian Voivodeship =

Czernice
- Village
- Location within Poland
- Coordinates: 52°54′N 20°44′E
- Country: Poland
- Voivodeship: Masovian
- County: Ciechanów
- Gmina: Opinogóra Górna
- Time zone: UTC+1 (CET)
  - Summer (DST): UTC+2 (CEST)
- Vehicle registration: WCI

Czernice [t͡ʂɛrˈnit͡sɛ] is a village in the administrative district of Gmina Opinogóra Górna, within Ciechanów County, Masovian Voivodeship, in north-central Poland.

Two Polish citizens were murdered by Nazi Germany in the village during World War II.
