= Sosnovo, Perm Krai =

Sosnovo Сосново
- Selo
- Location within Perm Krai Location within Russia
- Coordinates: 56°41′N 54°33′E
- Country: Russia
- Region: Perm Krai
- District: Chaykovsky
- Time zone: UTC+5:00

Sosnovo (Russian: Сосново) is a rural locality (a selo) and the administrative center of Sosnovskoye Rural Settlement, Chaykovsky, Perm Krai, Russia. The population was 924 as of 2010. There are 38 streets.
