= Łęki, Ciechanów County =

Łęki
- Village
- Location within Poland
- Coordinates: 52°53′N 20°50′E
- Country: Poland
- Voivodeship: Masovian
- County: Ciechanów
- Gmina: Opinogóra Górna
- Population: 150

Łęki [ˈwɛŋkʲi] is a village in the administrative district of Gmina Opinogóra Górna, within Ciechanów County, Masovian Voivodeship, in east-central Poland.
