= Marianka, Radomsko County =

Marianka
- Village
- Location within Poland
- Coordinates: 51°7′59″N 19°30′16″E
- Country: Poland
- Voivodeship: Łódź
- County: Radomsko
- Gmina: Gomunice

Marianka [maˈrjaŋka] is a village in the administrative district of Gmina Gomunice, within Radomsko County, Łódź Voivodeship, in central Poland.
