= Wąglin =

- Village
- Location within Poland
- Coordinates: 51°9′N 19°35′E
- Country: Poland
- Voivodeship: Łódź
- County: Radomsko
- Gmina: Gomunice

Wąglin [ˈvɔŋɡlin] is a village in the administrative district of Gmina Gomunice, within Radomsko County, Łódź Voivodeship, in central Poland.
