= Gertrudów =

- Village
- Location within Poland
- Coordinates: 51°10′20″N 19°33′51″E
- Country: Poland
- Voivodeship: Łódź
- County: Radomsko
- Gmina: Gomunice

Gertrudów [ɡɛrˈtruduf] is a village in the administrative district of Gmina Gomunice, within Radomsko County, Łódź Voivodeship, in central Poland.
