= Kocierzowy =

- Village
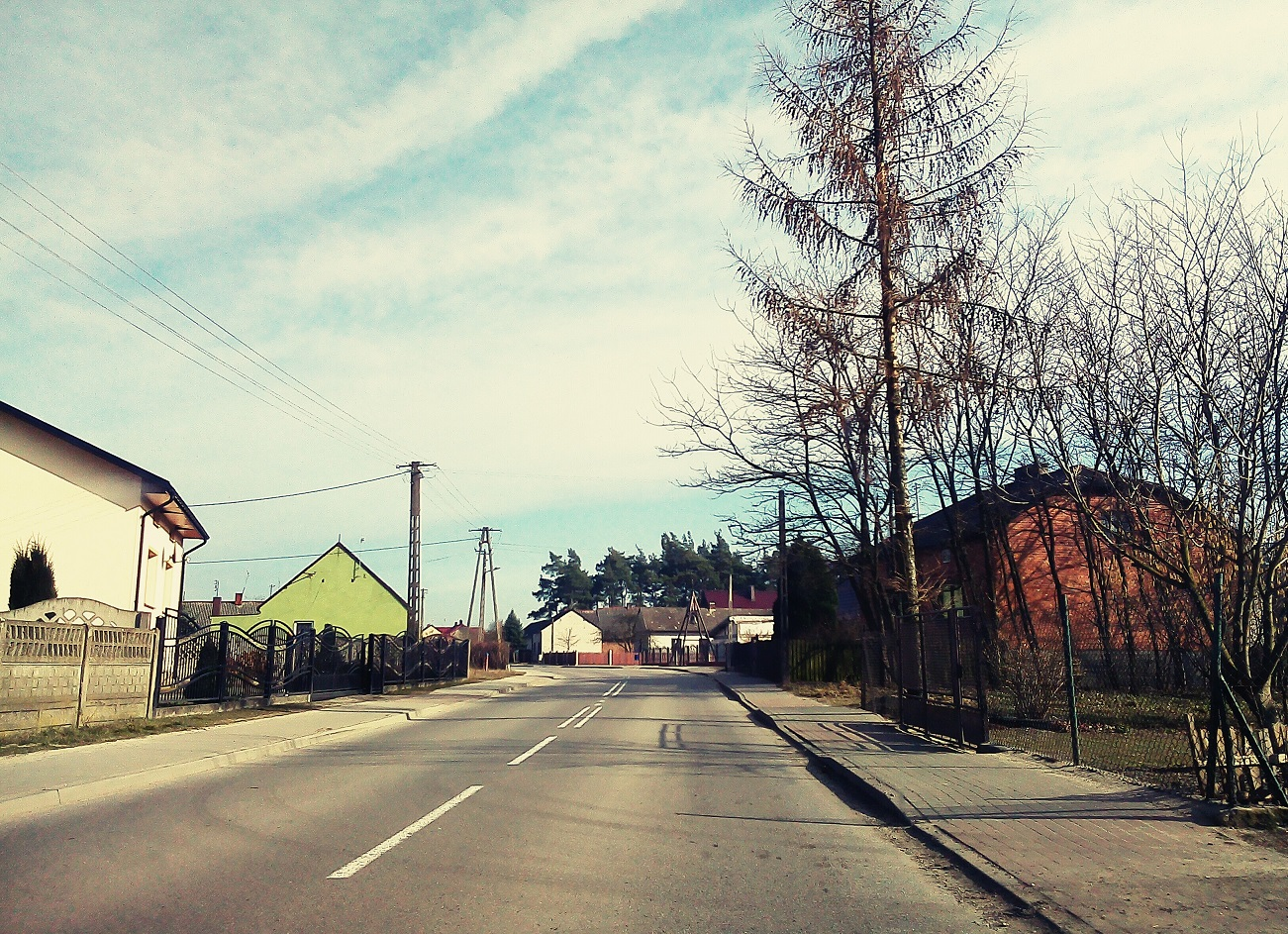

- Location within Poland
- Coordinates: 51°8′50″N 19°32′28″E
- Country: Poland
- Voivodeship: Łódź
- County: Radomsko
- Gmina: Gomunice

Kocierzowy [kɔt͡ɕɛˈʐɔvɨ] is a village in the administrative district of Gmina Gomunice, within Radomsko County, Łódź Voivodeship, in central Poland.
