= Wojciechów, Gmina Gomunice =

Wojciechów
- Settlement
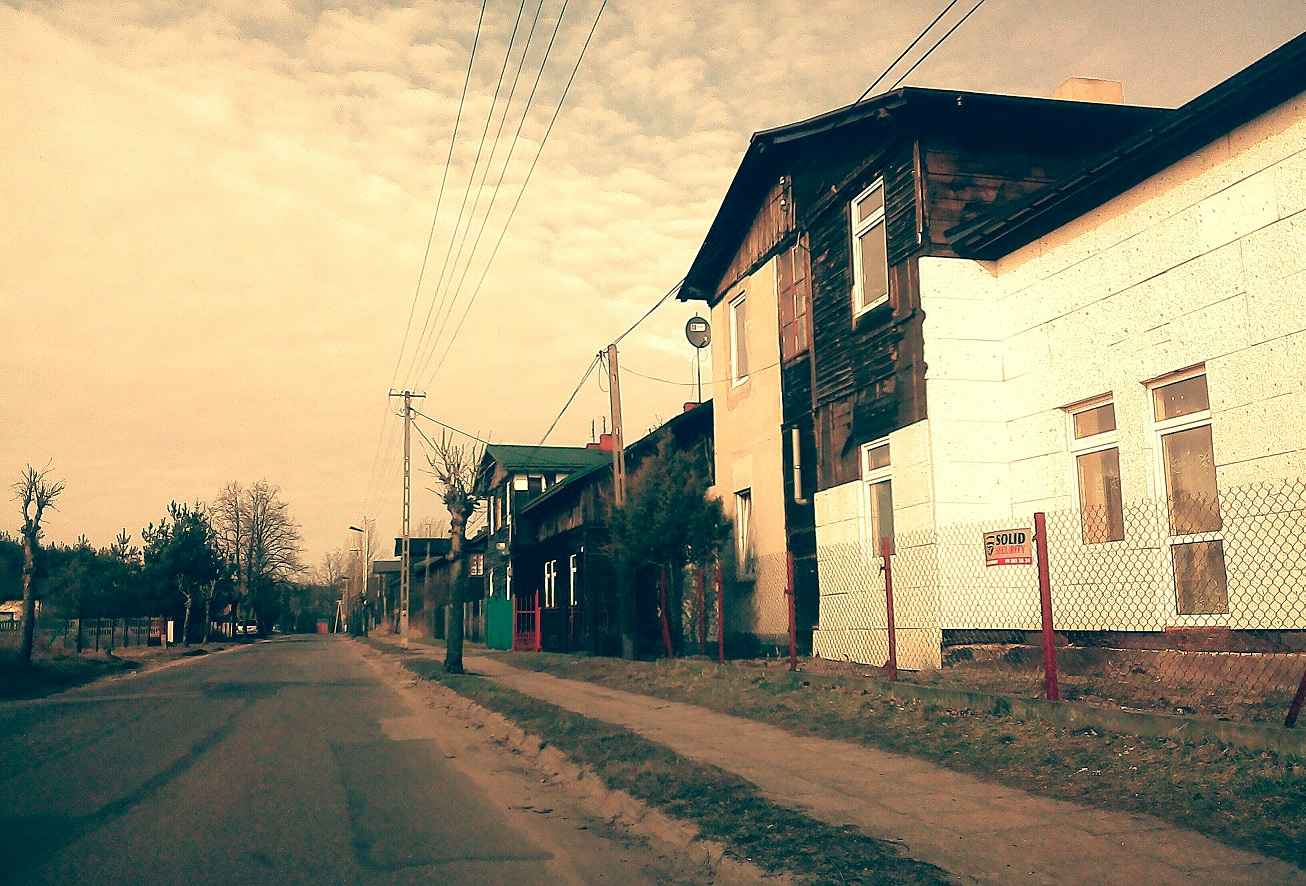

- Location within Poland
- Coordinates: 51°10′27″N 19°29′5″E
- Country: Poland
- Voivodeship: Łódź
- County: Radomsko
- Gmina: Gomunice

Wojciechów (Polish pronunciation: [vɔjˈt͡ɕɛxuf]) is a settlement in the administrative district of Gmina Gomunice, within Radomsko County, Łódź Voivodeship, in central Poland.
