= Słostowice =

- Village
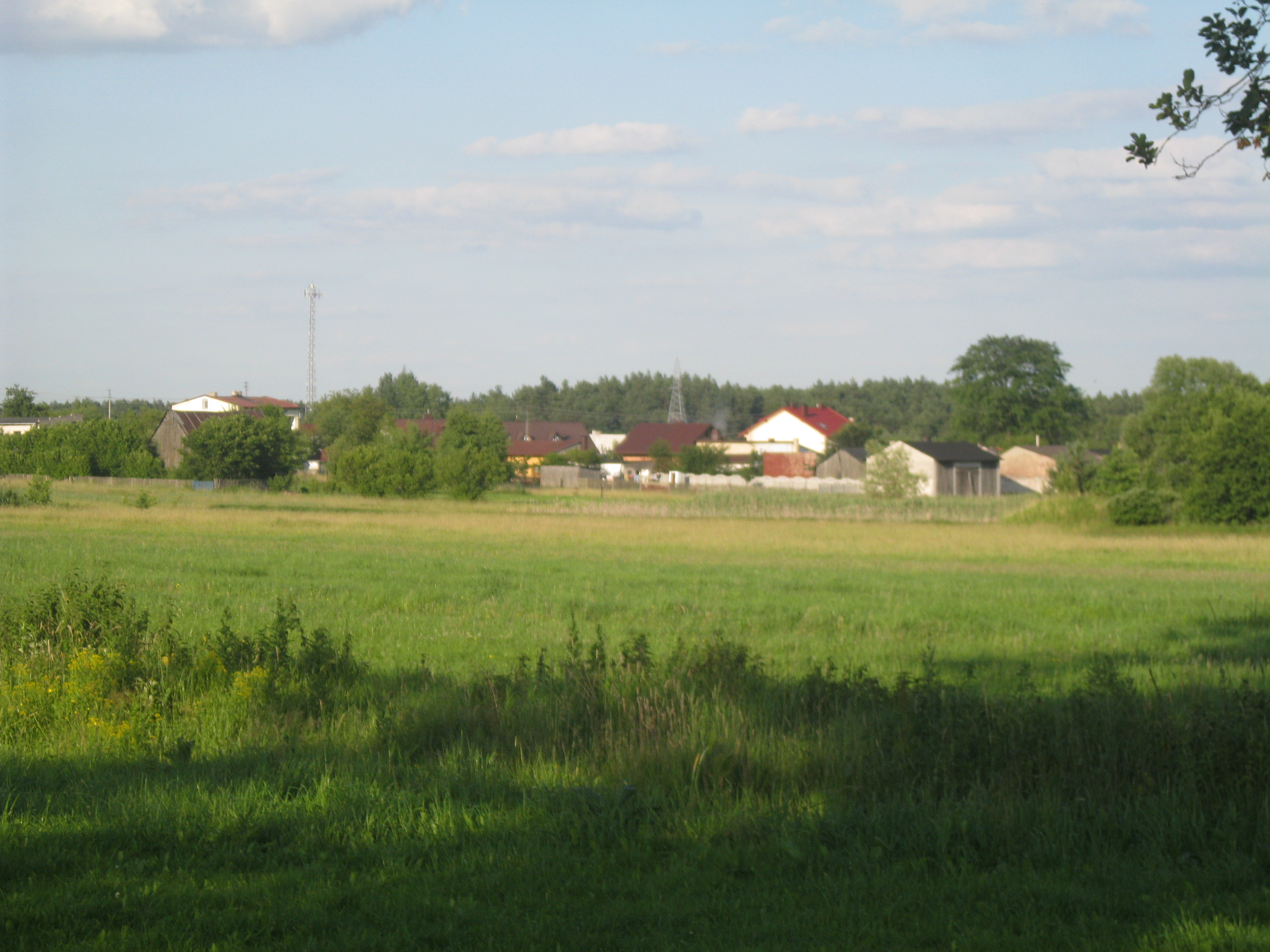

- Location within Poland
- Coordinates: 51°11′N 19°28′E
- Country: Poland
- Voivodeship: Łódź
- County: Radomsko
- Gmina: Gomunice

Słostowice [swɔstɔˈvit͡sɛ] is a village in the administrative district of Gmina Gomunice, within Radomsko County, Łódź Voivodeship, in central Poland.
