= Borowiecko-Kolonia =

- Village
- Location within Poland
- Coordinates: 51°8′13″N 19°28′57″E
- Country: Poland
- Voivodeship: Łódź
- County: Radomsko
- Gmina: Gomunice

Borowiecko-Kolonia [bɔrɔˈvjɛt͡skɔ kɔˈlɔɲa] is a village in the administrative district of Gmina Gomunice, within Radomsko County, Łódź Voivodeship, in central Poland.
