= Władysławowo, Ciechanów County =

Władysławowo
- Village
- Location within Poland
- Coordinates: 52°53′N 20°41′E
- Country: Poland
- Voivodeship: Masovian
- County: Ciechanów
- Gmina: Opinogóra Górna

Władysławowo [vwadɨswaˈvɔvɔ] is a village in the administrative district of Gmina Opinogóra Górna, within Ciechanów County, Masovian Voivodeship, in east-central Poland.
