= Hucisko, Radomsko County =

Hucisko
- Village
- Location within Poland
- Coordinates: 51°10′00″N 19°30′59″E
- Country: Poland
- Voivodeship: Łódź
- County: Radomsko
- Gmina: Gomunice

Hucisko [xuˈt͡ɕiskɔ] is a village in the administrative district of Gmina Gomunice, within Radomsko County, Łódź Voivodeship, in central Poland.
