= Kolonia Piaszczyce =

- Settlement
- Location within Poland
- Coordinates: 51°06′55″N 19°32′04″E
- Country: Poland
- Voivodeship: Łódź
- County: Radomsko
- Gmina: Gomunice

Kolonia Piaszczyce [kɔˈlɔɲa pjaʂˈt͡ʂɨt͡sɛ] is a settlement in the administrative district of Gmina Gomunice, within Radomsko County, Łódź Voivodeship, in central Poland.
