= Kletnia-Kolonia =

- Village
- Location within Poland
- Coordinates: 51°8′58″N 19°30′19″E
- Country: Poland
- Voivodeship: Łódź
- County: Radomsko
- Gmina: Gomunice
- Population: 130

Kletnia-Kolonia [ˈklɛtɲa kɔˈlɔɲa] is a village in the administrative district of Gmina Gomunice, within Radomsko County, Łódź Voivodeship, in central Poland.
