= Pałuki, Masovian Voivodeship =

Pałuki
- Village
- Location within Poland
- Coordinates: 52°52′N 20°45′E
- Country: Poland
- Voivodeship: Masovian
- County: Ciechanów
- Gmina: Opinogóra Górna

Pałuki (Polish pronunciation: [paˈwukʲi]) is a village in the administrative district of Gmina Opinogóra Górna, within Ciechanów County, Masovian Voivodeship, in east-central Poland.
