= Kletnia, Łódź Voivodeship =

Kletnia
- Village
- Location within Poland
- Coordinates: 51°9′28″N 19°29′57″E
- Country: Poland
- Voivodeship: Łódź
- County: Radomsko
- Gmina: Gomunice

Kletnia [ˈklɛtɲa] is a village in the administrative district of Gmina Gomunice, within Radomsko County, Łódź Voivodeship, in central Poland.
