= Chruścin, Łódź Voivodeship =

Chruścin
- Village
- Location within Poland
- Coordinates: 51°11′31″N 19°31′57″E
- Country: Poland
- Voivodeship: Łódź
- County: Radomsko
- Gmina: Gomunice

Chruścin [ˈxruɕt͡ɕin] is a village in the administrative district of Gmina Gomunice, within Radomsko County, Łódź Voivodeship, in central Poland.
