= Maciej Płaza =

Polish writer and literary scholar

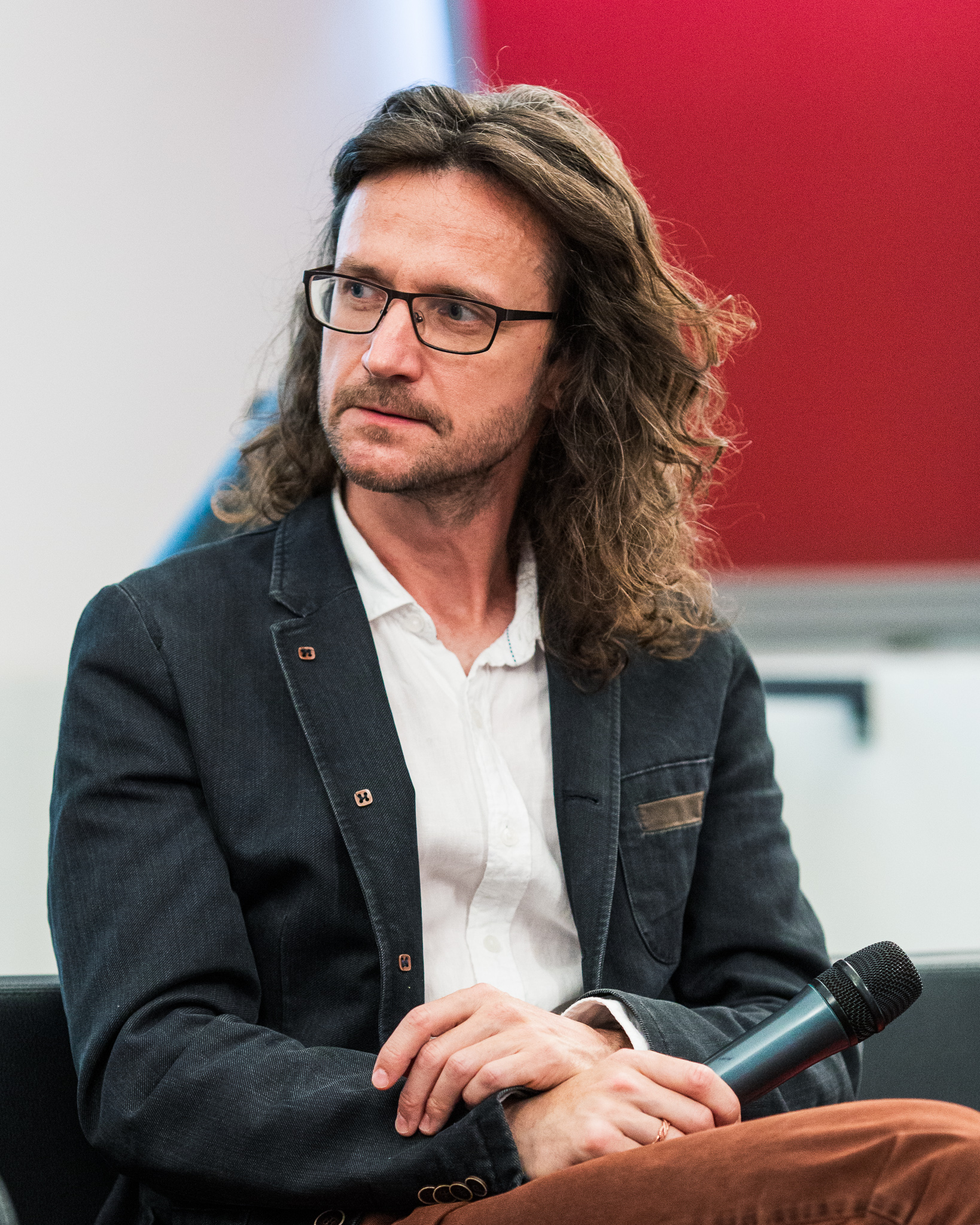
- Maciej Płaza, 2019
- Born: 16 December 1976 (age 49); Opinogóra, Poland
- Education: Maria Curie-Skłodowska University (UMCS)
- Occupations: Writer, translator
- Writing career
- Notable work: Robinson in Bolechów
- Notable awards: Kościelski Award (2016); Gdynia Literary Prize (2016); Angelus Award (2018)

Maciej Płaza (born 16 December 1976, in Opinogóra) is a Polish writer, literary scholar and translator of English literature.

== Life and career ==
He has a PhD in literary studies from Maria Curie-Skłodowska University in Lublin. He is a laureate of the Literature in the World Award for his translation of H.P. Lovecraft's collection of short stories The Dunwich Horror and Other Frightful Tales and was nominated for The Tadeusz Boy-Żeleński Translation Work Award for his translation of Arthur Machen's novel The Hill of Dreams.

In 2016, he became the recipient of the Gdynia Literary Prize as well as the Kościelski Award and was also nominated for Poland's top literary prize Nike Award for his collection of stories entitled Skoruń. In 2018, he won the Angelus Award for his novel Robinson in Bolechów becoming the first Polish writer to do so.

== Works ==
=== Scholarly works ===
- O poznaniu w twórczości Stanisława Lema, Wydawnictwo Uniwersytetu Wrocławskiego, Wrocław, 2006

=== Novels ===
- Skoruń, Wydawnictwo W.A.B., Warsaw, 2015
- Robinson w Bolechowie, Wydawnictwo W.A.B., Warsaw, 2017
- Golem, Wydawnictwo W.A.B., Warsaw 2021 (English translation by Antonia Lloyd-Jones: Golem, Pushkin Press, November 2026)

=== Translations ===
- Christos Tsiolkas, Martwa Europa, Replika, Poznań, 2010
- Fredric Jameson, Archeologie przyszłości: pragnienie zwane utopią i inne fantazje naukowe, Wydawnictwo Uniwersytetu Jagiellońskiego, Kraków, 2011 (co-author)
- Fredric Jameson, Postmodernizm czyli Logika kulturowa późnego kapitalizmu, Wydawnictwo Uniwersytetu Jagiellońskiego, Kraków, 2011
- Brian McHale, Powieść postmodernistyczna, Wydawnictwo Uniwersytetu Jagiellońskiego, Kraków, 2011
- H.P. Lovecraft, Zgroza w Dunwich i inne przerażające opowieści, Vesper, Poznań, 2012
- H.P. Lovecraft, Przyszła na Sarnath zagłada: opowieści niesamowite i fantastyczne, Vesper, Czerwonak, 2016
- Mary Shelley, Frankenstein czyli Współczesny Prometeusz, Vesper, Czerwonak, 2013
- Jenny Diski, Lata sześćdziesiąte, Officyna, Łódź, 2013
- Kenneth Grahame, O czym szumią wierzby, Vesper, Poznań, 2014
- Mark Helprin, Zimowa opowieść, Wydawnictwo Otwarte, Kraków, 2014, (co-author)
- Mark Helprin, Pamiętnik z mrówkoszczelnej kasety, Wydawnictwo Otwarte, Kraków, 2014
- Marjorie Perloff, Ostrze ironii: modernizm w cieniu monarchii habsburskiej, Ossolineum, Wrocław, 2018
- DeSales Harrison, Zostaw ten świat pełen płaczu, Marginesy, Warszawa, 2019
- Arthur Machen, Wzgórze przyśnień, PIW, Warszawa, 2020

== See also ==
- Polish literature
- Silesius Poetry Award
