= Kolonia Chrzanowice =

- Settlement
- Location within Poland
- Coordinates: 51°11′28″N 19°33′22″E
- Country: Poland
- Voivodeship: Łódź
- County: Radomsko
- Gmina: Gomunice

Kolonia Chrzanowice [kɔˈlɔɲa xʂanɔˈvit͡sɛ] is a settlement in the administrative district of Gmina Gomunice, within Radomsko County, Łódź Voivodeship, in central Poland.
