= Kosówka, Łódź Voivodeship =

Kosówka
- Village
- Location within Poland
- Coordinates: 51°10′59″N 19°28′41″E
- Country: Poland
- Voivodeship: Łódź
- County: Radomsko
- Gmina: Gomunice

Kosówka [kɔˈsufka] is a village in the administrative district of Gmina Gomunice, within Radomsko County, Łódź Voivodeship, in central Poland.
