= Chrzanowice, Radomsko County =

Chrzanowice
- Village
- Location within Poland
- Coordinates: 51°11′8″N 19°32′47″E
- Country: Poland
- Voivodeship: Łódź
- County: Radomsko
- Gmina: Gomunice

Chrzanowice [xʂanɔˈvit͡sɛ] is a village in the administrative district of Gmina Gomunice, within Radomsko County, Łódź Voivodeship, in central Poland.
