= Wielki Bór, Łódź Voivodeship =

Wielki Bór
- Settlement
- Location within Poland
- Coordinates: 51°10′10″N 19°29′36″E
- Country: Poland
- Voivodeship: Łódź
- County: Radomsko
- Gmina: Gomunice

Wielki Bór (Polish pronunciation: [ˈvjɛlkʲi ˈbur]) is a settlement in the administrative district of Gmina Gomunice, within Radomsko County, Łódź Voivodeship, in central Poland.
