= Gmina Opinogóra Górna =

Gmina Opinogóra Górna Opinogóra Górna Commune
- Gmina
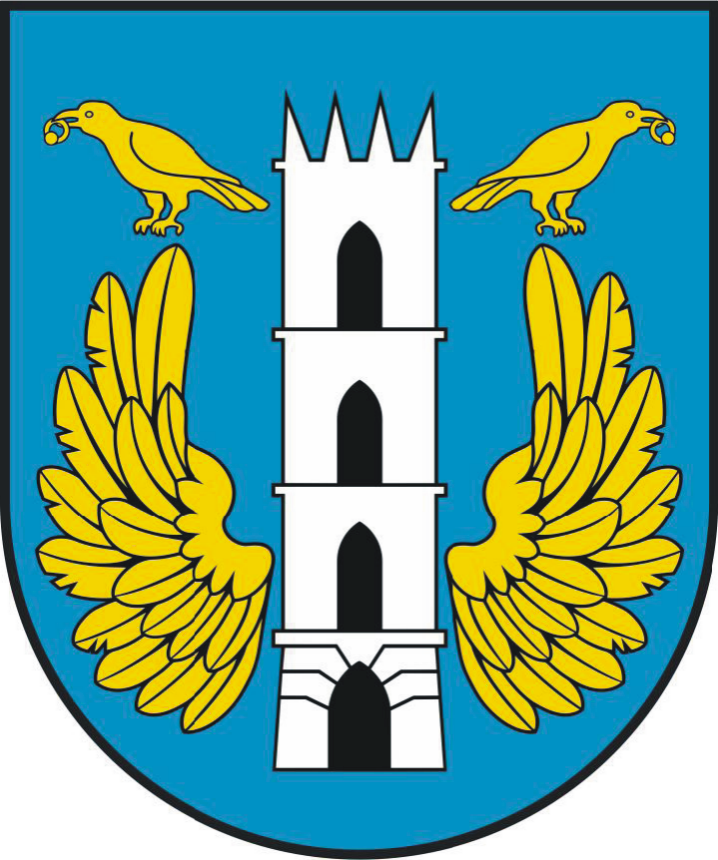
- Coat of arms
- Interactive map of Gmina Opinogóra Górna
- Coordinates (Opinogóra Górna): 52°54′N 20°43′E
- Country: Poland
- Voivodeship: Masovian
- County: Ciechanów
- Seat: Opinogóra Górna

Area
  - Total: 139.76 km^{2} (53.96 sq mi)

Population (2013)
  - Total: 5,982
  - Density: 42.80/km^{2} (110.9/sq mi)
- Website: http://www.opinogora.home.pl

Gmina Opinogóra Górna is a rural gmina (administrative district) in Ciechanów County, Masovian Voivodeship, in east-central Poland. Its seat is the village of Opinogóra Górna, which lies approximately 7 kilometres (4 mi) north-east of Ciechanów and 79 km (49 mi) north of Warsaw.

The gmina covers an area of 139.76 square kilometres (54.0 sq mi), and as of 2006 its total population is 5,980 (5,982 in 2013).

== Villages ==
Gmina Opinogóra Górna contains the villages and settlements of Bacze, Bogucin, Chrzanówek, Chrzanowo, Czernice, Długołęka, Dzbonie, Elżbiecin, Goździe, Janowięta, Kąty, Klonowo, Kobylin, Kołaczków, Kołaki-Budzyno, Kołaki-Kwasy, Kotermań, Łaguny, Łęki, Opinogóra Dolna, Opinogóra Górna, Opinogóra-Kolonia, Pajewo-Króle, Pałuki, Pokojewo, Pomorze, Przedwojewo, Przytoka, Rąbież, Rembówko, Rembowo, Sosnowo, Wierzbowo, Wilkowo, Władysławowo, Wola Wierzbowska, Wólka Łanięcka, Załuże-Imbrzyki, Załuże-Patory and Zygmuntowo.

== Neighbouring gminas ==
Gmina Opinogóra Górna is bordered by the town of Ciechanów and by the gminas of Ciechanów, Czernice Borowe, Gołymin-Ośrodek, Krasne and Regimin.
