= Elżbieta Chrzanowska-Kluczewska =

Polish English-language scholar (born 1953)

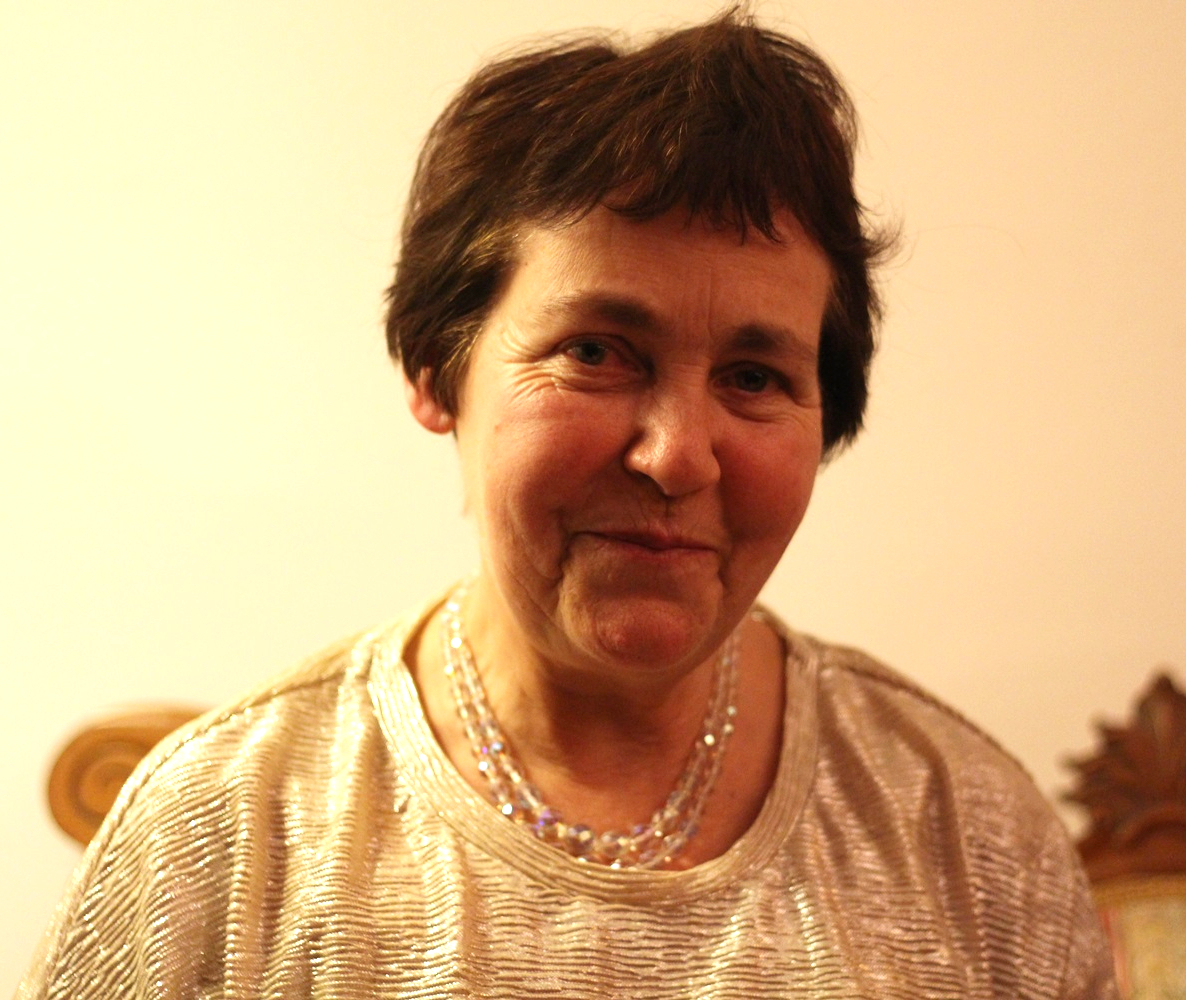
- Elżbieta Chrzanowska-Kluczewska, 2015
- Born: 1953 (age 72–73)
- Education: Jagiellonian University
- Occupations: English scholar, linguist

Elżbieta Maria Chrzanowska-Kluczewska (born 1953) is an English scholar, linguist, academic teacher, professor of humanities, honorary full professor of the Jagiellonian University, who was director of the Institute of English Philology at the Jagiellonian University between 2009–2012 and 2016–2020.

== Biography ==
The daughter of Tadeusz Chrzanowski. In 1978 she graduated from the Institute of English Studies at the Jagiellonian University. In 1990 she obtained doctorate upon dissertation Modalność reprezentowana na płaszczyźnie przedstawienia językowego zwanego formą logiczną. Studium o semantycznej interpretacji języka angielskiego supervised by Irena Kałuża. In 2005 she obtained habilitation. In 2016 she obtained the title of professor.

== Books ==
=== Monographs ===
- Language-Games: Pro and Against. Kraków: Universitas. 2004.
- Much More than Metaphor. Master Tropes of Artistic Language and Imagination. Frankfurt am Main: Peter Lang Editions. 2013.

=== Editions ===
- In Search of (Non)Sense. Newcastle u. Tyne: Cambridge Scholars Publishing. 2009. Together with Grzegorz Szpila.
- The Contextuality of Language and Culture. Bielsko-Biała: Wyższa Szkoła Ekonomiczno-Humanistyczna. 2009. Together with Agnieszka Gołda-Derejczyk.
- Language – Literature – The Arts: A Cognitive-Semiotic Interface. Frankfurt am Main: Peter Lang Edition. 2017. Together with Olga Vorobyova.
- Text-Image-Music. Crossing the Borders. IALS Symposium Krakow 2018. Book of Abstracts. Institute of English Studies, Jagiellonian University in Krakow. Together with Katarzyna Bazarnik and Ryszard Kurpiel. Online.
