= Chrzanowo =

Chrzanowo may refer to the following places:

- Chrzanowo, Kuyavian-Pomeranian Voivodeship (north-central Poland)
- Chrzanowo, Ciechanów County in Masovian Voivodeship (east-central Poland)
- Chrzanowo, Podlaskie Voivodeship (north-east Poland)
- Chrzanowo, Gmina Rzewnie in Masovian Voivodeship (east-central Poland)
- Chrzanowo, Gmina Szelków in Masovian Voivodeship (east-central Poland)
- Chrzanowo, Greater Poland Voivodeship (west-central Poland)
- Chrzanowo, Pomeranian Voivodeship (north Poland)
- Chrzanowo, Warmian-Masurian Voivodeship (north Poland)
