= Chrzanowo, Ciechanów County =

Chrzanowo
- Village
- Location within Poland
- Coordinates: 52°52′15″N 20°39′59″E
- Country: Poland
- Voivodeship: Masovian
- County: Ciechanów
- Gmina: Opinogóra Górna
- Population: 80

Chrzanowo [xʂaˈnɔvɔ] is a village in the administrative district of Gmina Opinogóra Górna, within Ciechanów County, Masovian Voivodeship, in east-central Poland.
