= Tadeusz Chrzanowski =

Art historian (1926–2006)

- Born: 14 May 1926
- Died: 24 December 2006 (aged 80)
- Education: Jagiellonian University
- Occupation: Art historian

Tadeusz Bonifacy Chrzanowski (14 May 1926 – 24 December 2006) was an art historian.

== Biography ==
In 1952 he graduated with master's degree in art history from the Jagiellonian University.

He supervised sixteen doctoral dissertations.

He was the father of Elżbieta Chrzanowska-Kluczewska.

== Works ==
- Rzeźba lat 1560–1650 na Śląsku Opolskim. 1974.
- Żywe i martwe granice. 1974.
- Sztuka Ziemi Krakowskiej. 1982. Co-authored with Marian Kornecki.
- Działalność artystyczna Tomasza Tretera. 1984.
- Złotnictwo toruńskie. 1988. Co-authored with Marian Kornecki.
- Wędrówki po Sarmacji europejskiej. 1989.
- Sztuka w Polsce Piastów i Jagiellonów. 1993.
- Polskie pomniki w świątyniach Rzymu. 1994. Co-authored with Marian Kornecki.
- Sztuka w Polsce. Od I do III Rzeczypospolitej. 1998.

== Awards ==
- Commander's Cross with Star of the Order of Polonia Restituta (1994)
- Laurel of Kraków of the 21st century (2002)
- Kraków Book of the Month Award for the book Polska sztuka sakralna (April 2002)
