= Chrzanówek =

- Village
- Location within Poland
- Coordinates: 52°52′43″N 20°39′39″E
- Country: Poland
- Voivodeship: Masovian
- County: Ciechanów
- Gmina: Opinogóra Górna

Population
  - Total: 140
- Time zone: UTC+1 (CET)
  - Summer (DST): UTC+2 (CEST)
- Vehicle registration: WCI
- Website: ugopinogora.bip.org.pl

Chrzanówek [xʂaˈnuvɛk] is a village in the administrative district of Gmina Opinogóra Górna, within Ciechanów County, Masovian Voivodeship, in north-central Poland.

Ten Polish citizens were murdered by Nazi Germany in the village during World War II.
