= Sosnovka, Sosnovsky District, Tambov Oblast =

Sosnovka Сосновка
- Urban-type settlement
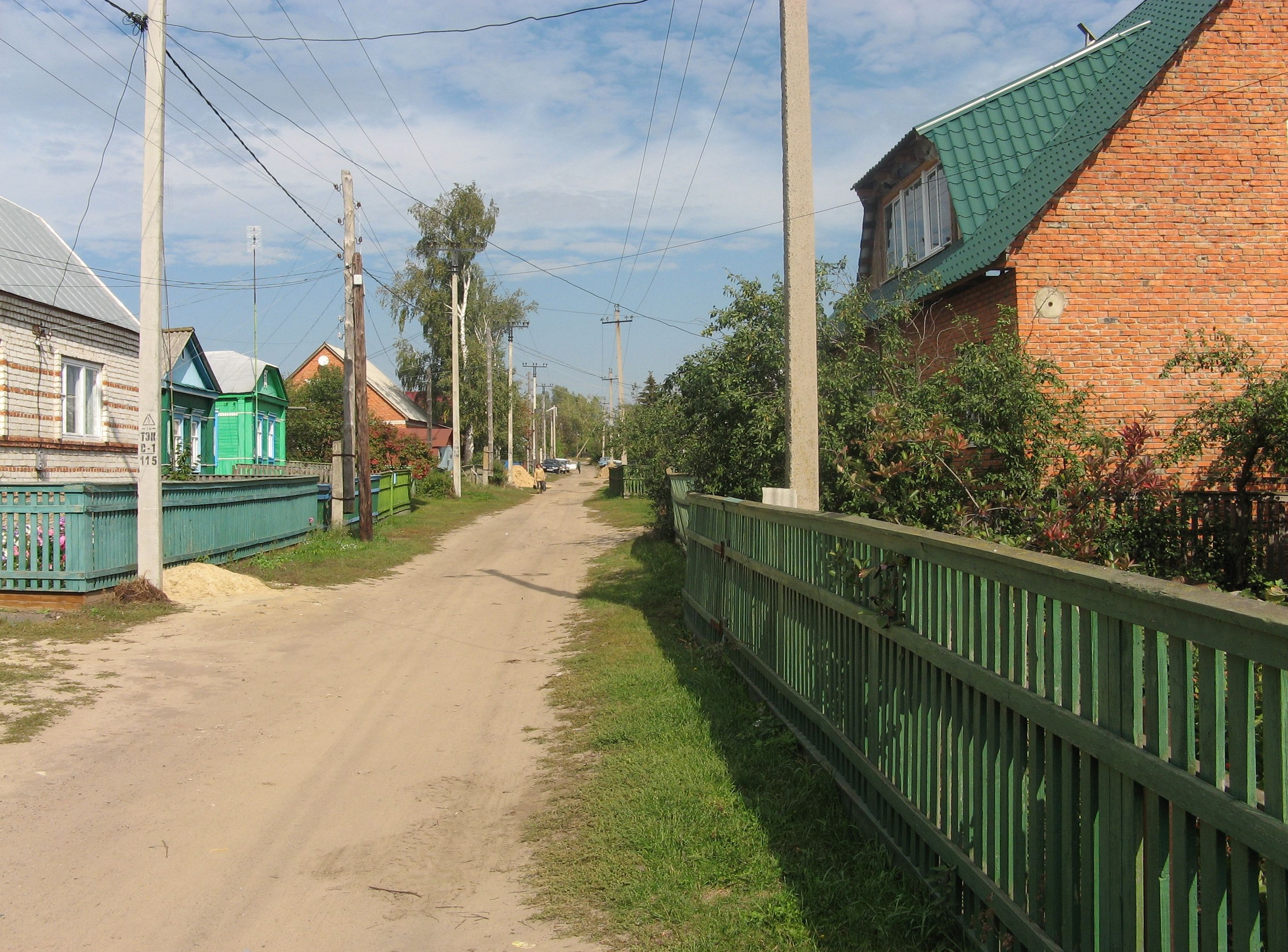
- Interactive map of Sosnovka
- Location of Sosnovka Sosnovka (Tambov Oblast)
- Coordinates: 53.2318°N 41.3701°E
- Country: Russia
- Federal subject: Tambov Oblast
- Administrative district: Sosnovsky District
- Founded: 1640
- Elevation: 116 m (381 ft)

Population (2010 Census)
  - Total: 9,189
  - Estimate (2021): 7,517 (−18.2%)
- Time zone: UTC+3 (MSK)
- Postal code: 393840
- OKTMO ID: 68634151051

Sosnovka (Russian: Сосновка) is an urban locality (an urban-type settlement) in Sosnovsky District of Tambov Oblast, Russia. Population: 9,189 (2010 census); 10,791 (2002 census); 11,814 (1989 Soviet census).
