= Kazimierz Chrzanowski =

Polish politician (born 1951)

member of Sejm 2005-2007
- In office 20 October 1997 – 4 November 2007

Personal details
- Born: 1951 (age 74–75)
- Party: Democratic Left Alliance

Kazimierz Chrzanowski (born 25 December 1951 in Łaziska Górne) is a Polish politician. He was elected to the Sejm on 25 September 2005, getting 11296 votes in 13 Kraków district as a candidate from the Democratic Left Alliance list.

He was also a member of the Sejm 1997-2001 and the Sejm 2001-2005.

== See also ==
- Members of Polish Sejm 2005-2007
