= Opinogóra Górna =

- Village
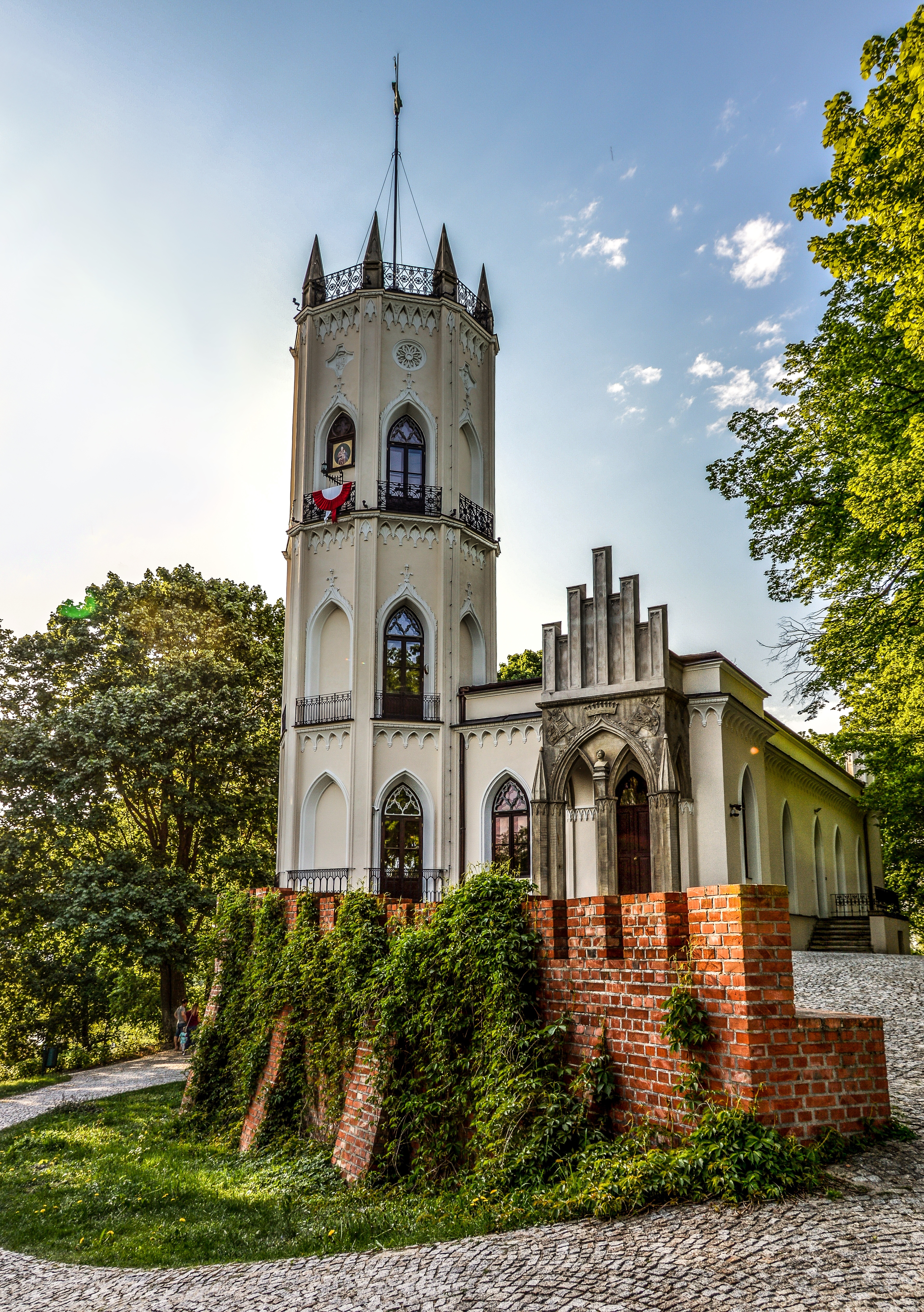
- Krasiński Palace in Opinogóra Górna

- Location within Poland
- Coordinates: 52°54′N 20°43′E
- Country: Poland
- Voivodeship: Masovian
- County: Ciechanów
- Gmina: Opinogóra Górna
- Population: 630

Opinogóra Górna [ɔpinɔˈɡura ˈɡurna] is a village in Ciechanów County, Masovian Voivodeship, in east-central Poland. It is the seat of the gmina (administrative district) called Gmina Opinogóra Górna.

== History ==
Residential complex—contains a castle, outbuilding, arcaded house and a park. Not existing today wooden mansion, probably built where originally a hunting mansion of dukes of Mazovia stood. It was demolished in the early 20th century.

Castle—situated on a hill in a landscaped park. The construction of the castle started in 1828 ordered by Wincenty Krasiński (owner of a castle from 1811). It was probably designed by a Henryk Marconi. The building was finished in 1843. The castle was offered as a gift from Wincenty to his son Zygmunt, on his marriage with Eliza Branicka. Before 1843 the castle was extended from the north with two big chambers. In 1894 the castle was restored and repainted to a design by Józef Huss. Again restored in 1912. By the time of first and second world war destroyed. Rebuilt from 1958 to 1960 eliminating some of changes made in a second half of the 19th century. From 1961 it contains a romanticism museum. The last restoration of the castle took place in 1973 to 1974.

Outbuilding—constructed probably in 1828 in a Gothic style. In 1894 added an annexe. In 1940, rebuilt without Gothic-style characteristics. Recently restored to old style.

Arcaded house—close to the park entrance built at the end of the 19th century. Completely restored in 1967.

== Architecture ==
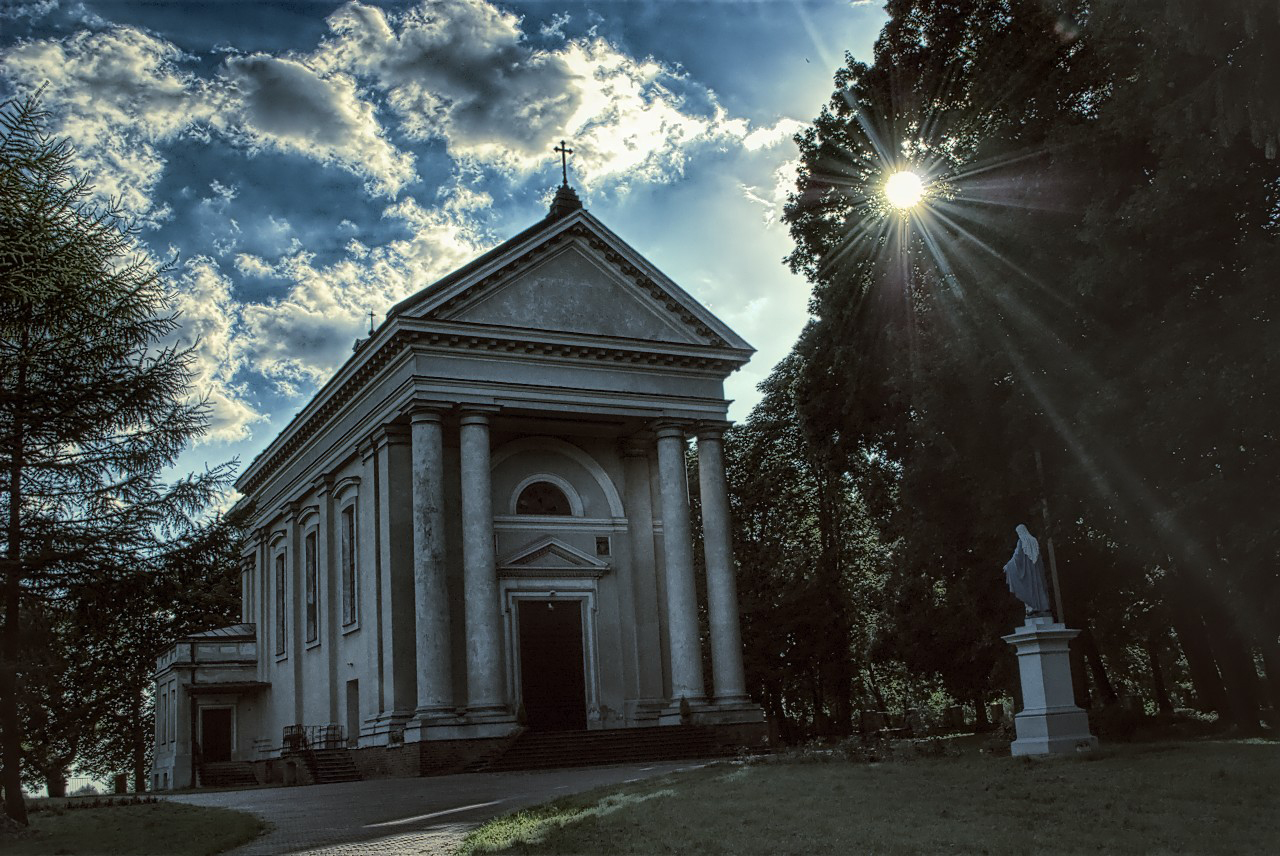
Church of the Assumption in Opinogóra Górna

Castle—neogothic style. Bricked, plastered. Bungalow, on a pedestal equalizing differences terrain. On a rectangular plan with a four-storey octagonal tower in the south-western corner of the porch, in the southern elevation limited by preceded terrace south-west retaining wall with a blanking. Basemented. Inside, the two strings of vaulted rooms enfilade system. Outside windows arched with the profiled frames with tracery. Crowning cornice with lancet arches, a wall above them originally decorated with panels. The walls in the lowest level are rusticated, dismembered deep lancet arches. On the final circuit are pinnacles between which placed a cast-iron balustrade. The roof of the tower lost on the rest of the building low hipped covered with a sheet. Museum collections associated with the romanticism era and the Krasińscy family. Inside the castle, two strings are located on the system enfilade of rooms. Variety rooms feature a neo-Gothic arches and stucco decoration. In the first vestibule is eight-sided cross-ribbed vaulting with rosette and palmette frieze of ogival arcades in the second brackets vaults vestibule—motifs bunch and fruit of the vine. One of the rooms notable for a vault with lunettes, decorated ogival ribs with stucco decoration of leaves oak beam coming down on the maidservants of leafy heads. On a leading rib appear the Horns of Radziwił's and Wincent Krasinski coat of arms. The walls are heated with cavities, which contains windows and tracery frames and decoration. In other areas occur among umbrella of the lancet vault lunettes. Slender and graceful Opinogóra castle is one of particular importance for the history of Polish architecture of the 19th century. The palace in Dowspuda is the next all-new neo-Gothic mansion built.

Outbuilding—bricked, plastered. Storeys and with cellars. Rectangular in shape, with the annexe to the east. Two-section interior layout. Tiled hipped roof.

Arcaded house—the nature of the classical. Brick, plastered. Arcade floor of the front supported by four wooden poles. Gable roof with eaves shielding half the peak arcade and shingled.

Park—landscaped formed in first half of the 19th century. Recomponed in 1895 by order of Franciszek Szaniora by graph of Walerian Kronkrajobenberg. Destroyed in both world wars, reconstructed partially. There is a neogothic brick bench placed in 1832 by Anna Bronikowska Załuska and a monument placed in 1838 by Wincenty Krasiński in memory of Bolesław IV duke of Masovia in the form of cross.

From the elements of small architecture we must say about all kind of objects placed in a park, like: monumental cross "lovers bench" and a monument of Krasiński. We can also see old gates at the entrance to the park. Infrastructure elements like bridge between ponds, strengthen of the dike or a fragments of the fence comes from decades and much coming from the aesthetics of other artifacts.

== Notable people ==
- Maciej Płaza (born 1976), writer and translator
