= Katarzyna Chrzanowska =

Polish actress

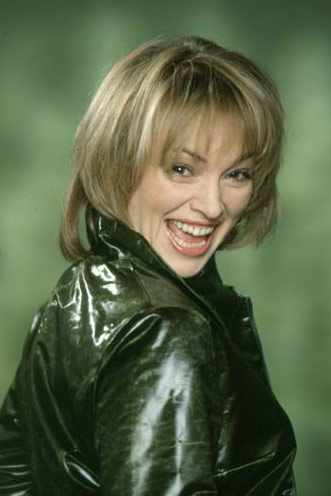
- Born: 11 October 1963 (age 62); Warsaw, Poland
- Occupation: Actress
- Spouse: Piotr Niemkiewicz
- Children: 2

Katarzyna Chrzanowska (born 11 October 1963) is a Polish film and television actress.

== Early life and education ==
After graduation from Joachim Lelewel High School in Warsaw, Chrzanowska studied at Aleksander Zelwerowicz National Academy of Dramatic Art in Warsaw where she graduated in 1986.

== Career ==
In 1987, Chrzanowska received the Medal of Young Art and at Opole Theater Confrontations, she made her stage debut in the role of Alicja in Witold Gombrowicz's Virginity and also performed on the stage of Teatr Nowy in Poznań, with which she was associated in 1986–1987. After one year of working in the theater, she received a scholarship to the Conservatoire National Superieur d'Art Dramatique in Paris, where she graduated in 1988.

After making her television debut in the TV series Żuraw i czapla (1985), Chrzanowska made her first feature film debut in the role of Róża in Cudzannieka, a psychological film based on the novel of the same name by Maria Kuncewiczowa (1986), opposite Ewa Wiśniewska. Then she portrayed a high school student Irena in the adventure film Harley's Tale (1987) with Jan Jankowski and Leszek Teleszyński.

Her role of Ewa Werner in the Polsat series Adam i Ewa (2000–2001) brought her popularity in Poland, where she formed a power couple with Waldemar Goszcz; after the broadcast, these two actors were still associated with each other by the press and the media. Chrzanowska has also appeared on talk shows, such as Rozmowy w toku. In 2007, she starred as a gardener in an advertisement for DiFortan. Chrzanowska starred in the soap opera Pierwsza miłość in 2010. Five years later, she reappeared on television in the series True Law as a judge.

== Personal life ==
In 1989, Chrzanowska met her future husband, Piotr Niemkiewicz, the owner of a company dealing with the conservation of monuments. From this marriage they had twin daughters Stefania and Celina born in 1993. Her husband drowned while diving during a family vacation in Crete in 2002. After Niemkiewicz's death, in 2003, she returned to Paris, where she started running her late husband's company and raising her daughters.
