= Sosnovsky District, Tambov Oblast =

Sosnovsky District Сосновский район (Russian)
- District
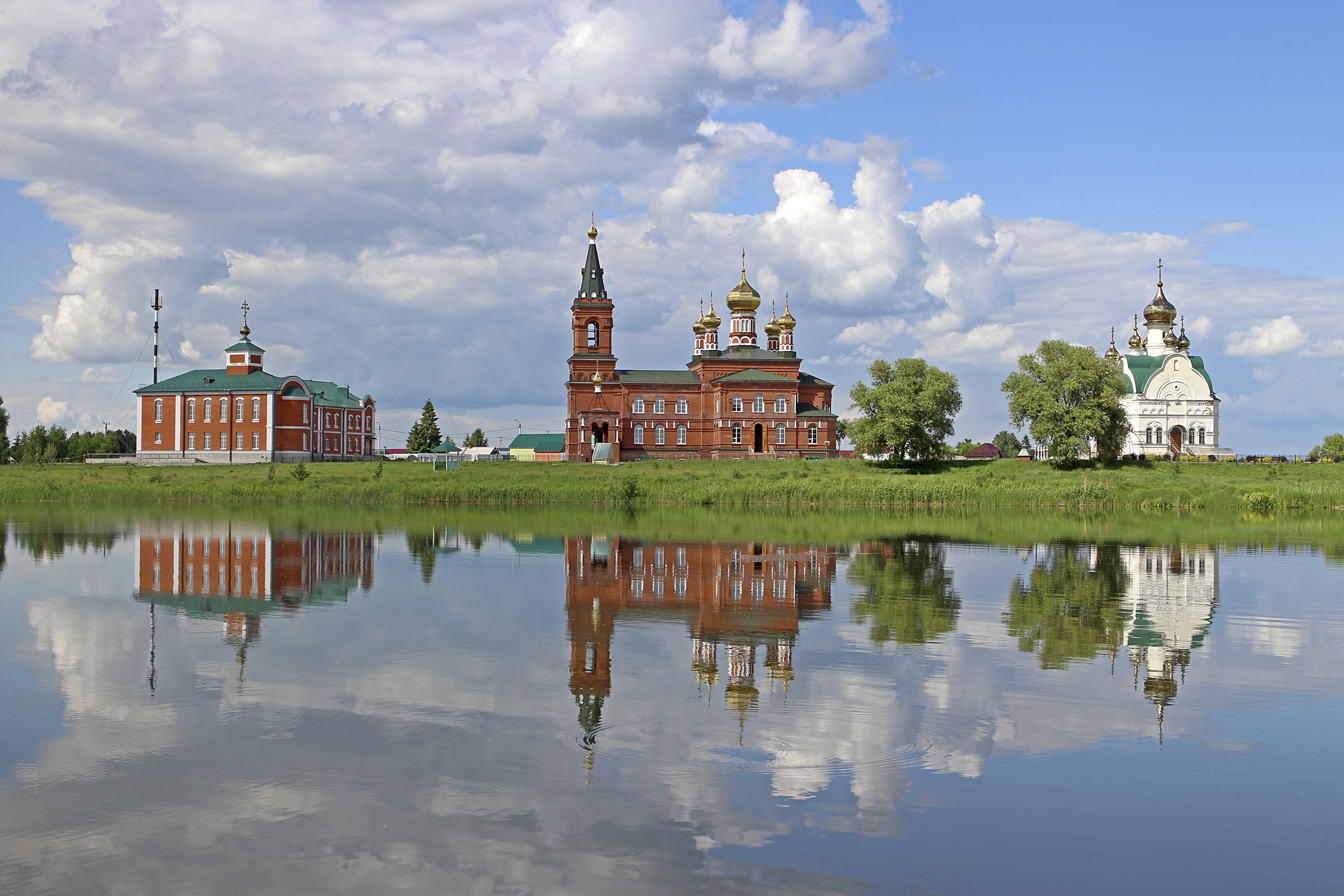
- Mamontova Pustyn

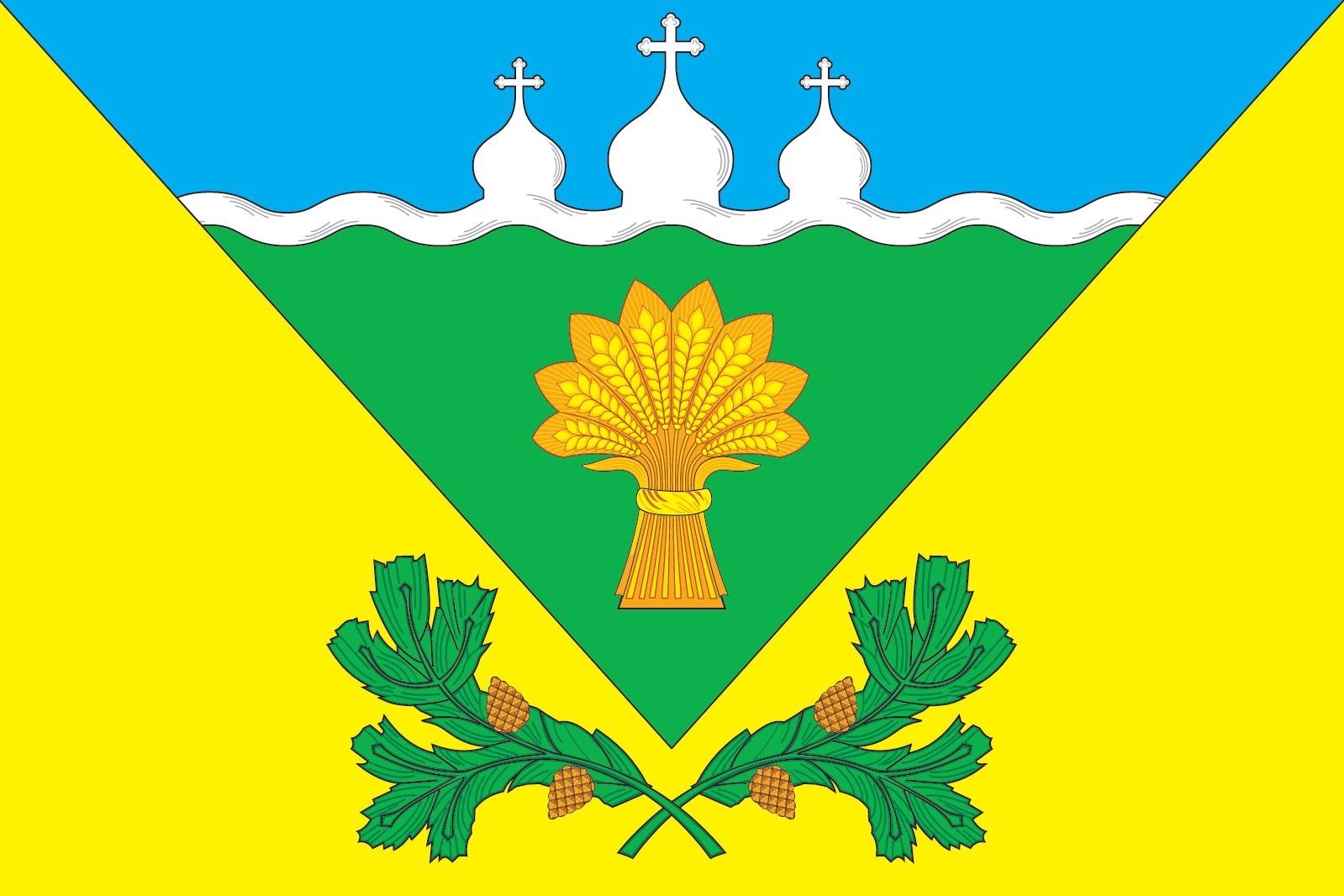
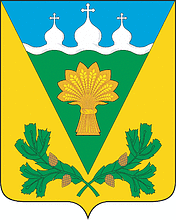
- Flag Coat of arms
- Location of Sosnovsky District in Tambov Oblast
- Coordinates: 53°14′13″N 41°22′14″E
- Country: Russia
- Federal subject: Tambov Oblast
- Established: 1928
- Administrative center: Sosnovka

Area
  - Total: 2,382 km^{2} (920 sq mi)

Population (2010 Census)
  - Total: 31,641
  - Density: 13.28/km^{2} (34.40/sq mi)
  - Urban: 29.0%
  - Rural: 71.0%

Administrative structure
  - Administrative divisions: 1 Settlement councils, 16 Selsoviets
  - Inhabited localities: 1 urban-type settlements, 89 rural localities

Municipal structure
  - Municipally incorporated as: Sosnovsky Municipal District
  - Municipal divisions: 1 urban settlements, 16 rural settlements
- Time zone: UTC+3 (MSK)
- OKTMO ID: 68634000
- Website: http://r32.tmbreg.ru/

Sosnovsky District (Russian: Сосно́вский райо́н) is an administrative and municipal district (raion), one of the twenty-three in Tambov Oblast, Russia. It is located in the north of the oblast. The district borders with Morshansky District in the north, Pichayevsky District in the east, Tambovsky District in the south, and with Staroyuryevsky District in the west. The area of the district is 2,382 square kilometers (920 sq mi). Its administrative center is the urban locality (a work settlement) of Sosnovka. Population: 31,641 (2010 Census); 39,253 (2002 census); 48,133 (1989 Soviet census). The population of Sosnovka accounts for 29.0% of the district's total population.

== Notable residents ==
- Oleg Pashinin (born 1974), Uzbekistani football player and coach, born in Degtyanka
- Aleksey Polosin (1924–1943), Red Army sergeant, Hero of the Soviet Union, born in the village of Kazinka
