= Rąbież, Ciechanów County =

Rąbież
- Village
- Location within Poland
- Coordinates: 52°56′28″N 20°42′33″E
- Country: Poland
- Voivodeship: Masovian
- County: Ciechanów
- Gmina: Opinogóra Górna
- Population (2011): 116
- Postal code: 06-406
- Area code: +(48)
- Vehicle registration: WCI

Rąbież [ˈrɔmbjɛʂ] is a village in the administrative district of Gmina Opinogóra Górna, within Ciechanów County, Masovian Voivodeship, in east-central Poland.

== History ==
From 1975 to 1998, the village belongs to Ciechanów Voivodeship.

== Climate ==
The climate is moderate, characterized by mild winters and warm summers. The average temperature in January is -1 °C to -5 °C, in July it is +17 °C to +19 °C. Precipitation is 500–800 mm.
