= Chrzanów (disambiguation) =

Chrzanów is a town in Lesser Poland Voivodeship (S Poland).

Chrzanów may also refer to:

- Chrzanów, Lower Silesian Voivodeship (south-west Poland)
- Chrzanów, Lublin Voivodeship (east Poland)
- Chrzanów, Świętokrzyskie Voivodeship (south-central Poland)
- Chrzanów, Warsaw
- Nowy Chrzanów, Warsaw
