= Sosnovskoye, Sosnovsky District, Nizhny Novgorod Oblast =

Sosnovskoye Сосновское
- Urban-type settlement
- Interactive map of Sosnovskoye
- Location of Sosnovskoye Sosnovskoye (Nizhny Novgorod Oblast)
- Coordinates: 55.8043°N 43.1709°E
- Country: Russia
- Federal subject: Nizhny Novgorod Oblast
- Administrative district: Sosnovsky District

Population (2010 Census)
  - Total: 8,746
  - Estimate (2025): 8,354 (−4.5%)
- Time zone: UTC+3 (MSK)
- Postal code: 606170
- OKTMO ID: 22650151051

Sosnovskoye (Russian: Сосно́вское) is an urban locality (an urban-type settlement) in Sosnovsky District of Nizhny Novgorod Oblast, Russia. Population: 8,746 (2010 census); 9,207 (2002 census); 9,187 (1989 Soviet census).
