= Morshansky District =

Morshansky District Моршанский район (Russian)
- District
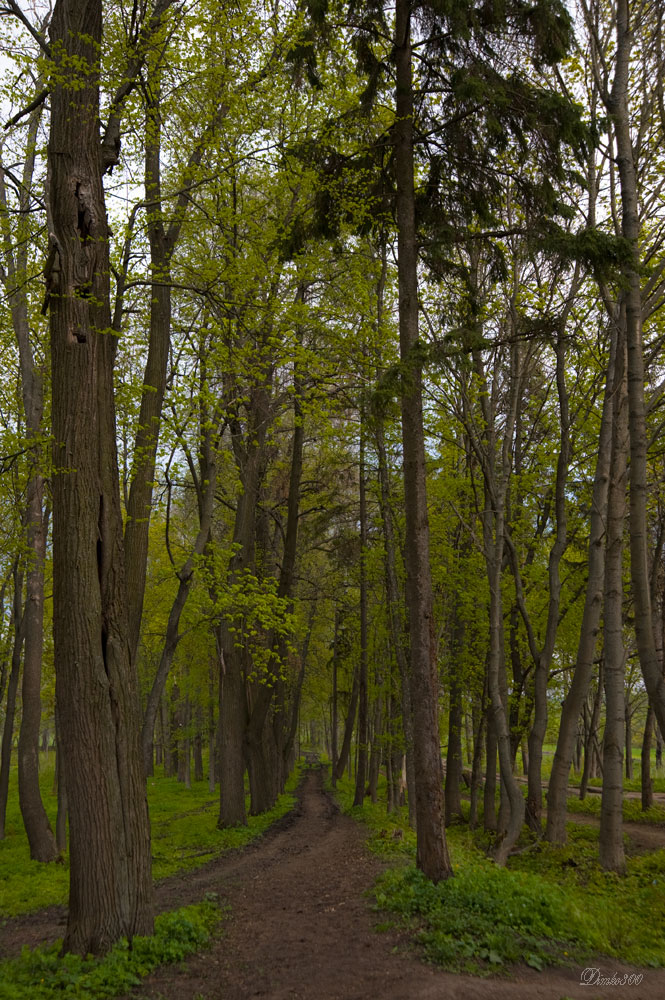
- A park in the selo of Novotomnikovo; a protected area of Russia in Morshansky District

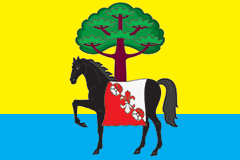
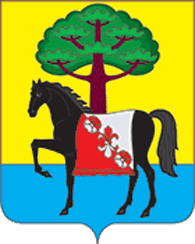
- Flag Coat of arms
- Location of Morshansky District in Tambov Oblast
- Coordinates: 53°27′N 41°49′E
- Country: Russia
- Federal subject: Tambov Oblast
- Established: 10 July 1928
- Administrative center: Morshansk

Area
  - Total: 2,880 km^{2} (1,110 sq mi)

Population (2010 Census)
  - Total: 34,088
  - Density: 11.8/km^{2} (30.7/sq mi)
  - Urban: 0%
  - Rural: 100%

Administrative structure
  - Administrative divisions: 16 Selsoviets
  - Inhabited localities: 117 rural localities

Municipal structure
  - Municipally incorporated as: Morshansky Municipal District
  - Municipal divisions: 0 urban settlements, 16 rural settlements
- Time zone: UTC+3 (MSK)
- OKTMO ID: 68616000
- Website: http://rmorshansk.ru

Population of Morshansky District
- 2010 Census: 34,088
- 2002 Census: 38,228
- 1989 Census: 44,688
- 1979 Census: 56,886

Morshansky District (Russian: Морша́нский райо́н) is an administrative and municipal district (raion), one of the twenty-three in Tambov Oblast, Russia. It is located in the north of the oblast and borders Shatsky District of Ryazan Oblast in the north, Zemetchinsky District of Penza Oblast in the east, Pichayevsky District in the south, and Sarayevsky District of Ryazan Oblast in the west. The area of the district is 2,880 square kilometers (1,110 sq mi). Its administrative center is the town of Morshansk (which is not administratively a part of the district). As of the 2010 Census, the total population of the district was 34,088.

== Administrative and municipal status ==
Within the framework of administrative divisions, Morshansky District is one of the twenty-three in the oblast. The town of Morshansk serves as its administrative center, despite being incorporated separately as a town of oblast significance—an administrative unit with the status equal to that of the districts.

As a municipal division, the district is incorporated as Morshansky Municipal District. The town of oblast significance of Morshansk is incorporated separately from the district as Morshansk Urban Okrug.
