= Sosnovsky District, Nizhny Novgorod Oblast =

Sosnovsky District Сосновский район (Russian)
- District
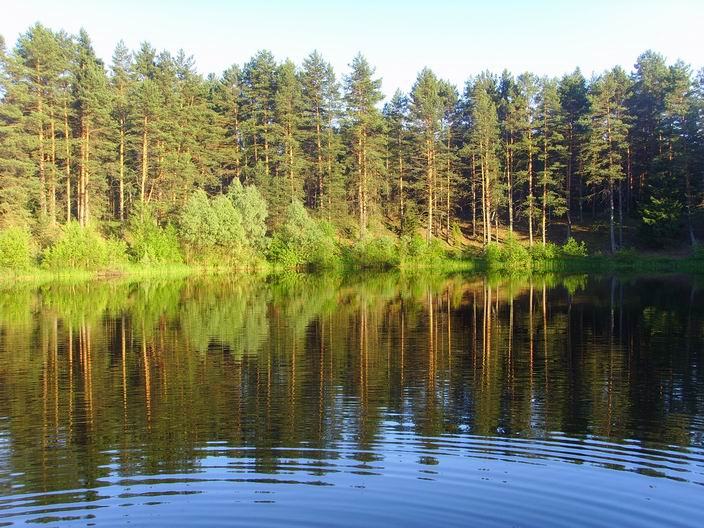
- Lake Ryazanovo, Sosnovsky District

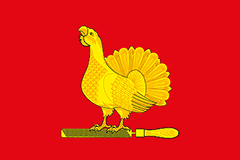
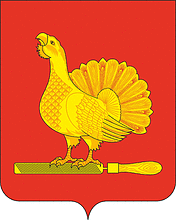
- Flag Coat of arms
- Location of Sosnovsky District in Nizhny Novgorod Oblast
- Coordinates: 55°48′04″N 43°09′46″E
- Country: Russia
- Federal subject: Nizhny Novgorod Oblast
- Established: 1935
- Administrative center: Sosnovskoye

Area
  - Total: 1,170.6 km^{2} (452.0 sq mi)

Population (2010 Census)
  - Total: 19,546
  - Density: 16.697/km^{2} (43.246/sq mi)
  - Urban: 44.7%
  - Rural: 55.3%

Administrative structure
  - Administrative divisions: 1 Work settlements, 8 Selsoviets
  - Inhabited localities: 1 urban-type settlements, 65 rural localities

Municipal structure
  - Municipally incorporated as: Sosnovsky Municipal District
  - Municipal divisions: 1 urban settlements, 8 rural settlements
- Time zone: UTC+3 (MSK)
- OKTMO ID: 22650000
- Website: http://www.sosnovskoe.info

Sosnovsky District (Russian: Сосно́вский райо́н) is an administrative district (raion), one of the forty in Nizhny Novgorod Oblast, Russia. Municipally, it is incorporated as Sosnovsky Municipal District. It is located in the southwest of the oblast. The area of the district is 1,170.6 square kilometers (452.0 sq mi). Its administrative center is the urban locality (a work settlement) of Sosnovskoye. Population: 19,546 (2010 Census); 21,923 (2002 census); 25,513 (1989 Soviet census). The population of Sosnovskoye accounts for 44.7% of the district's total population.

== History ==
The district was established in 1935.
