= Joseph Fournier =

Joseph Fournier may refer to:

- J. Michel Fournier (1905–1992), Canadian politician
- Joseph Augustin Fournier (1759–1828), French general
