= Battle of Pułtusk (1806) =

1806 Battle during the War of the Fourth Coalition

- Part of the War of the Fourth Coalition
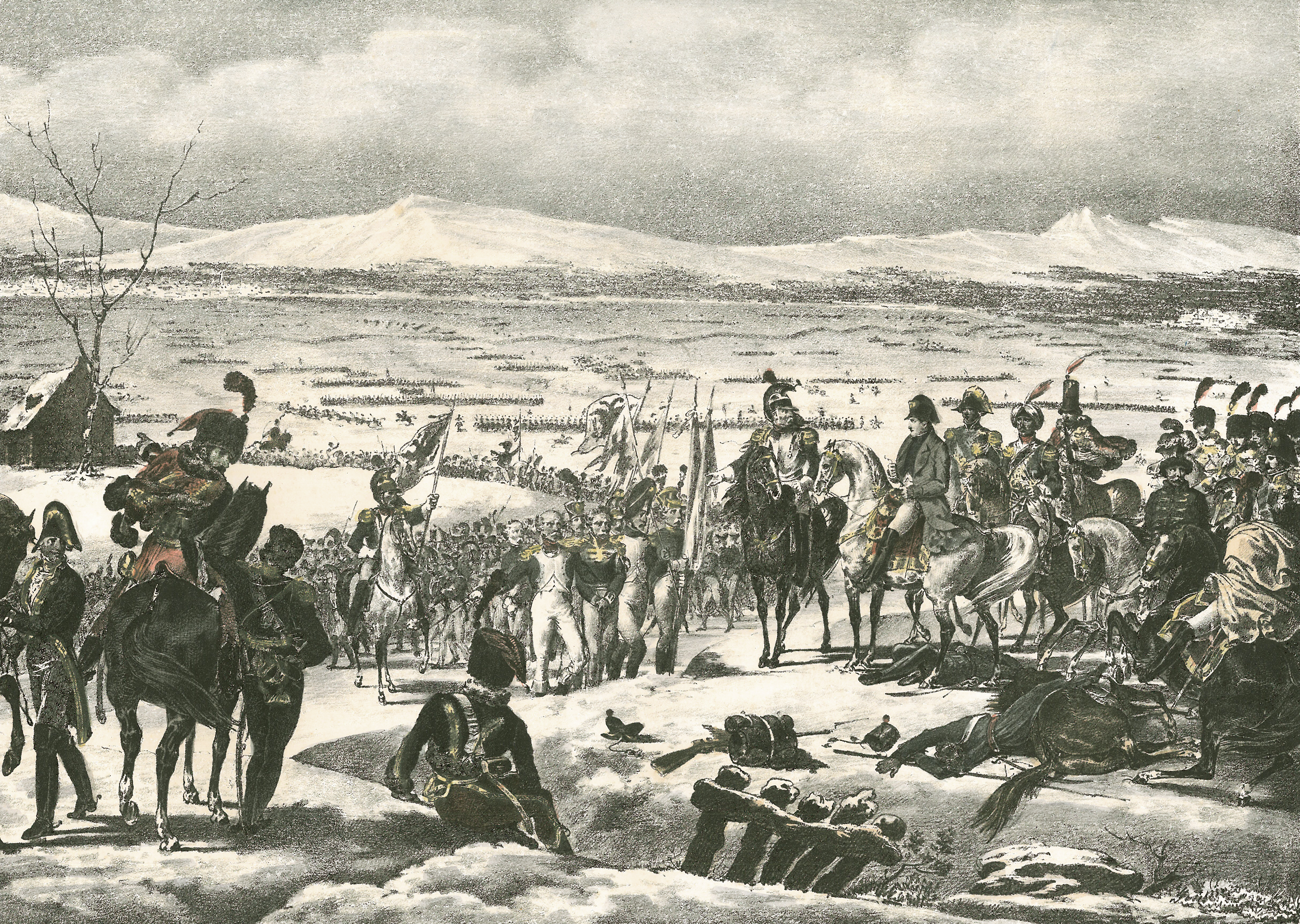
- Battle of Pułtusk 1806
Date	26 December 1806
Location	Pułtusk, New East Prussia 52°43′N 21°06′E
Result	French victory

Belligerents
(France) French Empire (Kingdom of Bavaria) Bavaria	(Russia) Russian Empire; Kingdom of Prussia

Commanders and leaders
(France) Jean Lannes (WIA)	(Russia) Levin A. von Bennigsen (Russia) Barclay de Tolly

Strength
25,000–27,000 plus an unknown number of guns	40,000–45,000, of which 35,000 in combat, plus 128 guns

Casualties and losses
3,300 killed or wounded 700 captured See also § Analysis	3,500 killed or wounded 12 guns lost See also § Analysis

War of the Fourth Coalition
⬤ current battle
⬤ Napoleon not in command
⬤ Napoleon in command

The Battle of Pułtusk (or Pultusk) took place on 26 December 1806 during the War of the Fourth Coalition near Pultusk, Prussia (today Pułtusk, Poland). Despite their strong numerical superiority and artillery, the Russians under the lead of General of Cavalry Levin von Benningsen underwent heavy French attacks by Marshal Jean Lannes, before retiring the next day having suffered great losses like the French, disorganizing their army for the rest of the year.

== Background ==
=== Strategic context ===
After defeating the Prussian army in the autumn of 1806, Emperor Napoleon entered partitioned Poland to confront the Russian army, which had been preparing to support the Prussians until their sudden defeat. Crossing the River Vistula, the French advance corps took Warsaw on 28 November 1806.

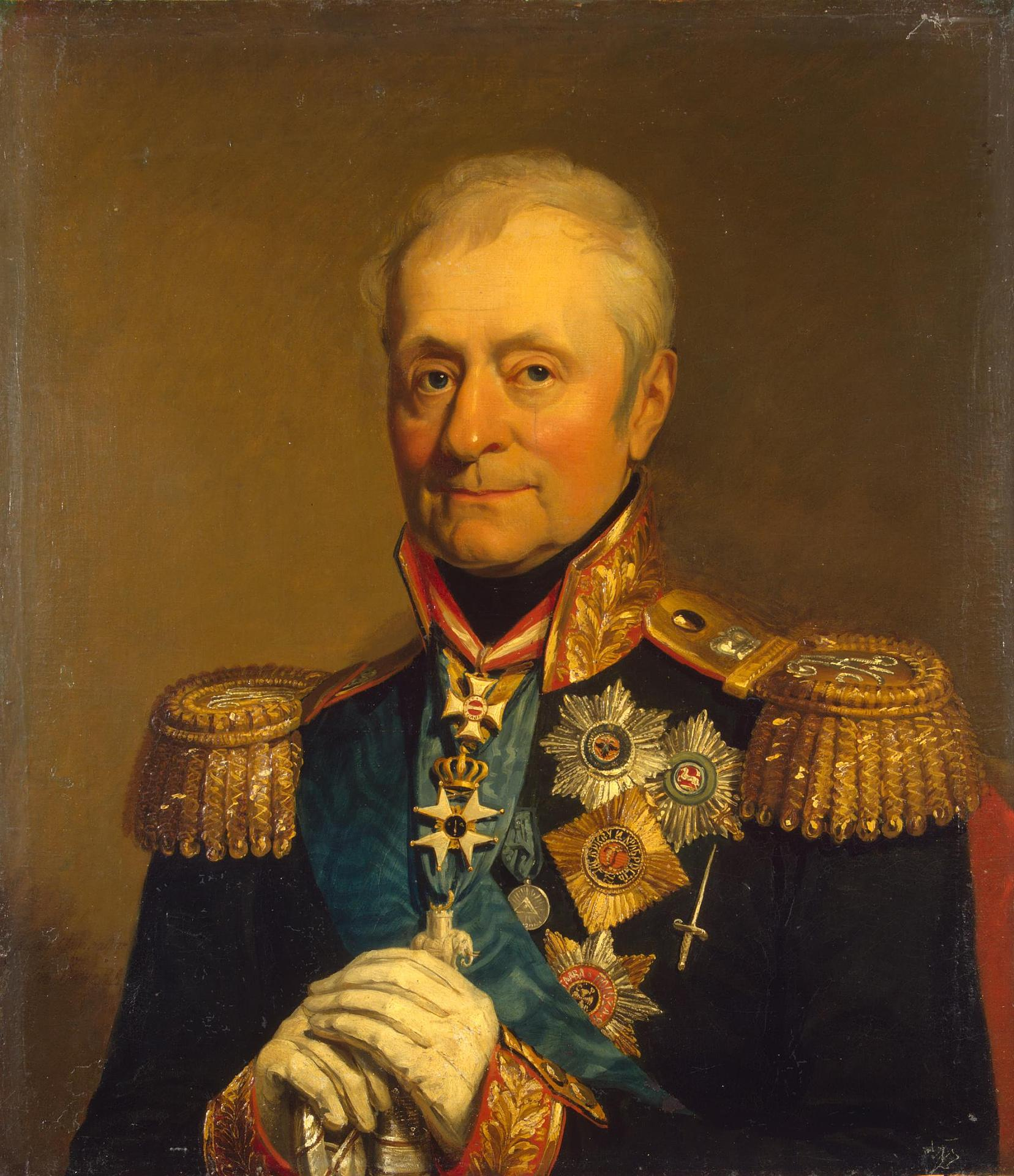
Levin August Bennigsen

The Russian army was under the overall command of Field Marshal Mikhail Kamensky, but he was old and becoming infirm. The Russian First Army of some 55,000 to 68,000 men, commanded by Count Bennigsen, had fallen back from the Vistula to the line of the River Wkra (Ukra), in order to unite with the Second Army, about 37,000 strong, under General Friedrich Wilhelm von Buxhoeveden (Buxhöwden), which was approaching from Russia and was still several days march from the First Army. However, realising his mistake in allowing the French to cross the Vistula, Kamensky advanced at the beginning of December to try to regain the line of the river. French forces crossed the Narew River at Modlin on 10 December, and the Prussian Corps commanded by General-Leutnant Anton Wilhelm von L'Estocq failed to retake Thorn (Toruń). This led Bennigsen on 11 December to issue orders to fall back and hold the line of the River Wkra.

When this was reported to Napoleon, he assumed the Russians were in full retreat. He ordered the forces under Marshal Joachim Murat – the 3rd corps of Marshal Louis Nicolas Davout, 5th Corps under Lannes, 7th Corps of Marshal Pierre Augereau, and Murat's own 1st Cavalry Reserve Corps – to pursue towards Pułtusk. Meanwhile, Marshal Michel Ney's 6th Corps, Marshal Jean-Baptiste Bernadotte's 1st Corps, and Marshal Jean-Baptiste Bessières's 2nd Cavalry Reserve Corps were tasked to turn the Russian right. Marshal Nicolas Soult's 4th Corps linked the two wings of the French army.

Kamensky reversed the Russian retreat, and he ordered an advance to support the troops on the River Wkra. On the night of 23 and 24 December, Davout's corps forced a crossing of the lower Wkra in the Battle of Czarnowo. After engagements at Bieżuń on 23 December with Bessières and Soldau (Działdowo) on 25 December with Ney, the Prussian corps under L'Estocq was driven north towards Königsberg. Augereau's corps seized a second crossing of the Wkra on the 24th at Kołoząb. Realising the danger, Kamensky ordered a retreat to Ostrołęka; the old field marshal, however, appears to have had a mental breakdown and withdrew himself to Grodno. Bennigsen decided to disobey his superior's orders by standing and fighting on 26 December at Pułtusk. He had available the 2nd Division of Lieutenant General Alexander Ivanovich Ostermann-Tolstoy, the 6th Division of Lieutenant General Alexander Karlovich Sedmoratski, part of Lieutenant General Dmitry Golitsyn's 4th Division, and part of Lieutenant General Fabian Gottlieb von Osten-Sacken's 3rd Division. To the north-west, most of the 4th Division commanded by Golitsyn and the 5th Division under Lieutenant General Dmitry Dokhturov fought the Battle of Gołymin on the same day.

=== Weather ===
The weather caused severe difficulties for both sides. Mild autumn weather had lasted longer than normal. The usual frosts, which rendered the inadequate roads passable after the muddy conditions of autumn, were broken by thaws. There was a thaw on 17 December and a two-day thaw on 26 and 27 December. The result was that both sides found it very difficult to manoeuvre; in particular the French (as they were advancing) had great difficulty bringing up their artillery. Davout recorded it took two hours to cover 2 1/2 miles.

There were also difficulties with supply. Captain Marcellin Marbot, who was serving with Augereau's Corps wrote:

It rained and snowed incessantly. Provisions became very scarce; no more wine, hardly any beer, and what there was exceedingly bad, no bread, and quarters for which we had to fight the pigs and the cows.

=== Site ===
Pułtusk lies on the west bank of the River Narew with a suburb on the east bank. The road from Strzegociz crossed the river by a bridge and then ran north-west towards Gołymin. A second road from Warsaw entered the town from the south-west, and then ran along the west bank of the river towards Różan. Before it reached Pułtusk this road was joined by one from Nasielsk. Another longer route to Różan ran along the east bank. The final road was that to Markow, which ran northwards from the town. The town itself lay on low ground. To the north and west lay a plateau, narrowing to a wide ridge nearer the river. A ravine cut into the plateau near the river. A large wood lay on the north-west side of the plateau, towards the village of Mosin. Further out from the plateau more woods covered the approaches from Warsaw.

== Battle ==
=== Forces ===
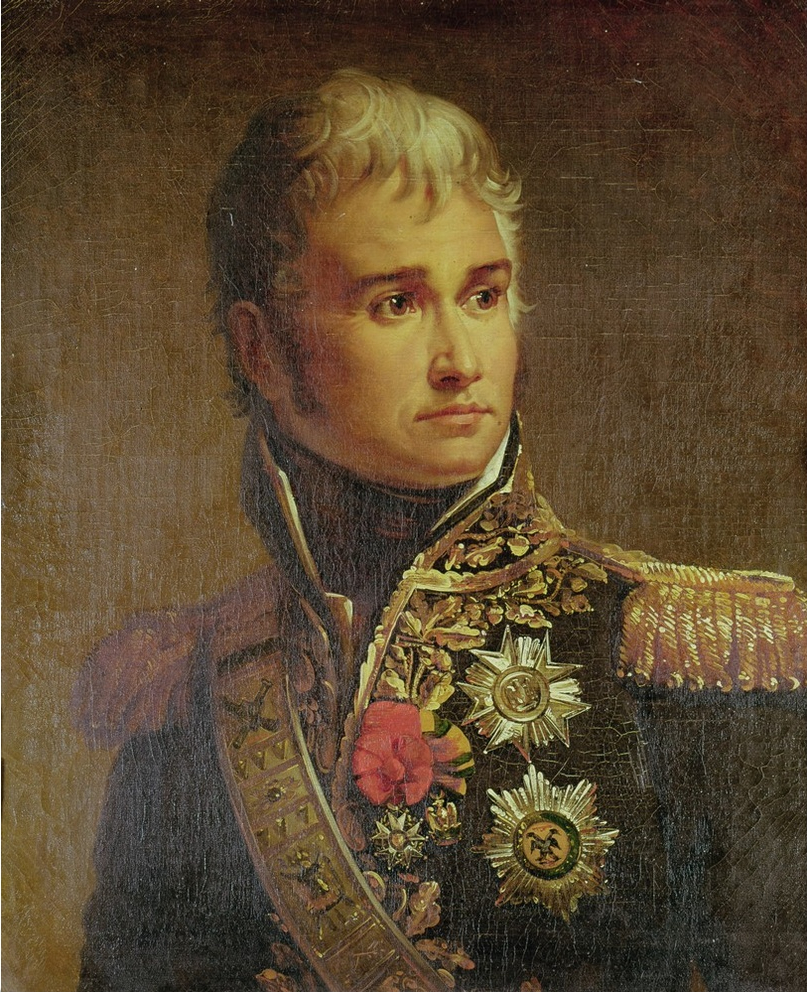
Jean Lannes

Lannes commanded two infantry divisions under Generals of Division Louis Gabriel Suchet and Honoré Théodore Maxime Gazan de la Peyrière. Suchet's 1st Division included General of Brigade Michel Marie Claparède's 3-battalion 17th Light Infantry Regiment, General of Brigade Honoré Charles Reille's 4-battalion 34th Line Infantry Regiment and 3-battalion 40th Line Infantry Regiment, and General of Brigade Dominique Honoré Antoine Vedel's 64th and 88th Line Infantry Regiments, three battalions each. Gazan's 2nd Division comprised General of Brigade Jean François Graindorge's 3-battalion 21st Light Infantry Regiment and 2-battalion 28th Light Infantry Regiment and General of Brigade François Frédéric Campana's 100th and 103rd Line Infantry Regiments, three battalions each. General of Brigade Anne-François-Charles Trelliard led 12 squadrons of the corps cavalry, which consisted of the 9th and 10th Hussar Regiments and the 21st Chasseurs à Cheval Regiment. General of Brigade Louis Foucher de Careil commanded the corps artillery, 38 guns in four foot and two horse artillery batteries at full strength. Smith itemized Colbert-Chabanais' 6th Corps cavalry but repeated Trelliard's list of regiments, which was clearly a misprint.

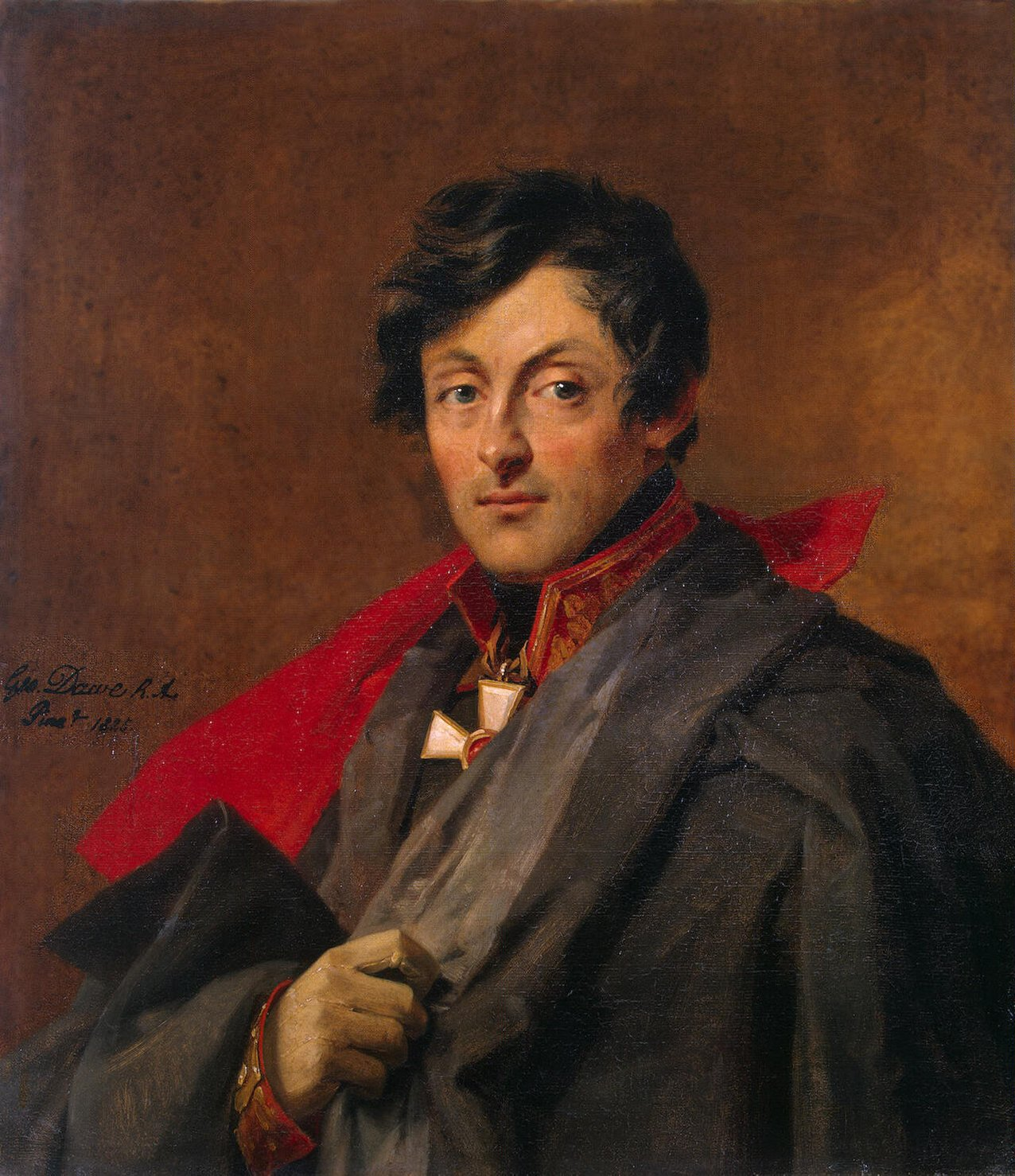
A. Ostermann-Tolstoi

Historian Francis Loraine Petre wrote that General of Division Nicolas Léonard Beker's 1,200-strong 5th Dragoon Division was also present, but did not note its composition. Petre mentioned Beker and Trelliard, but not Colbert-Chabanais. Petre stated that Beker led the 5th Division. Digby Smith placed Beker in charge of the 2nd Dragoon Division and listed the 3rd, 4th, 10th, 11th, 13th, and 22nd Dragoon Regiments as part of this unit. These units are identical to Grouchy's division. General of Brigade Joseph Augustin Fournier Marquis de D'Aultane was the acting commander of the 3rd Division of Davout's corps. This unit was made up of two brigades. General of Brigade Claude Petit led the 2-battalion 12th Line Infantry Regiment and the 3-battalion 21st Line Infantry Regiment. General of Brigade Nicolas Hyacinthe Gautier directed the 25th and 85th Line Infantry Regiments, two battalions each. General of Division Louis Michel Antoine Sahuc led the 4th Dragoon Division, which only had one brigade present. General of Brigade Jacques Léonard Laplanche commanded the 15th and 25th Dragoon Regiments. Fournier had 70 chasseurs à cheval, 100 dragoons, and only one artillery piece attached to his command. The rest of the corps cavalry was at Gołymin.

Bennigsen commanded Ostermann-Tolstoy's 2nd Division, Sedmoratski's 6th Division, and elements of the 3rd and 4th Divisions. The 2nd Division had three infantry and one cavalry brigades. Major General Nikolai Mazovsky directed the Pavlovski Grenadier and Rostov Musketeer Regiments, Major General Aleksandr Yakovlevich Sukin led the Petersburg Grenadier and Jeletzsky Musketeer Regiments, and Major General Ivan Andreievich Lieven commanded the 1st and 20th Jager Regiments. Major General Koschin's cavalry brigade included the Life Cuirassier, Kargopol Dragoon, and Soum Hussar Regiments, plus two cossack units. There were a total of 60 artillery pieces in four foot batteries and one horse artillery batteries.

The 6th Division also controlled three infantry and one cavalry brigades. Major General Karl Gustav von Baggovut led the Starokolski Musketeer and 4th Jäger Regiments, Major General Vasili Sergeievich Rachmanov commanded the Vilnius and Nizov Musketeer Regiments, and Major General Fedosei Mikhailovich Bikov directed the Reval and Volhynia Musketeer Regiments. Major General Karl Osipovich Lambert's cavalry brigade comprised the Ekaterinoslav Cuirassier, Kiev Dragoon, and Alexandrov Hussar Regiments, plus one Tatar and one cossack unit. The 6th Division artillery numbered 72 guns in five foot and one horse artillery batteries. The units of the 3rd and 4th Divisions are not listed. Altogether, Bennigsen controlled 50,500 men in 66 battalions, 55 squadrons, and his artillery.

=== Action ===
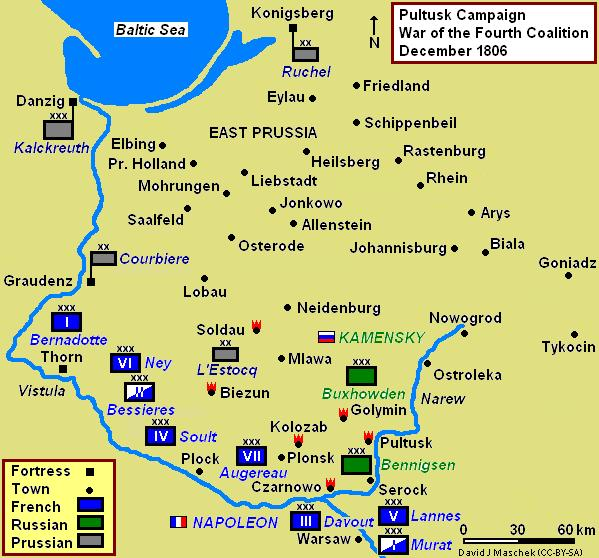
The Pułtusk Campaign Map shows the positions of the French, Russian, and Prussian forces at the end of December 1806. Actions were fought at Bieżuń and Czarnowo on the 23rd, Kołoząb on the 24th, Soldau on the 25th, and Pułtusk and Gołymin on the 26th.

Bennigsen arrayed his forces along the Pułtusk-Gołymin road, with three lines composed respectively of 21, 18 and 5 battalions. The left rested on the town, the right on the Mosin wood. The artillery was positioned in front of the first line. On the extreme right Major General Michael Andreas Barclay de Tolly occupied part of the Mosin wood with three battalions, a cavalry regiment and an artillery battery covering the road to Gołymin. Baggovut covered the left of the line and the bridge over the Narew from a position in front of the ravine with ten battalions, two squadrons of dragoons and an artillery battery. Deployed along the edge of the ridge were 28 squadrons of cavalry linking Barclay de Tolly and Baggovut. Cossack cavalry was deployed in front of them.

Marshal Lannes had orders to cross the Narew at Pułtusk with his corps. He was aware that there was a Russian force in front of him, but did not know its size. After struggling through the mud, his first troops reached the area at about 10:00 AM, and drove the cossacks back onto the Russian main line. Because of the terrain, Lannes could only see the Russian advance positions on the extreme left and right with the cavalry between them.

Lannes deployed Suchet's division on his left, opposite the Mosin wood. Gazan's division covered the rest of the Russian line. The few guns were deployed on the left and in the centre.

At about 11:00 AM the French right advanced against Baggovut. The Russian cossacks and cavalry were driven back and Baggovut sent forward a Jäger unit, which was driven back despite artillery support. The French centre had also advanced, to attack Baggovut from the flank. But this manoeuvre exposed them to the Russian cavalry line, seven squadrons of which suddenly attacked the French flank in a sudden snow storm while Baggovut's cavalry and the jägers attacked from the front. A French infantry battalion then took the Russian cavalry in their flank. After a confused melee the Russians fell back to their original position. Lannes's cavalry division, under Trelliard tried to advance but was driven off by artillery fire.

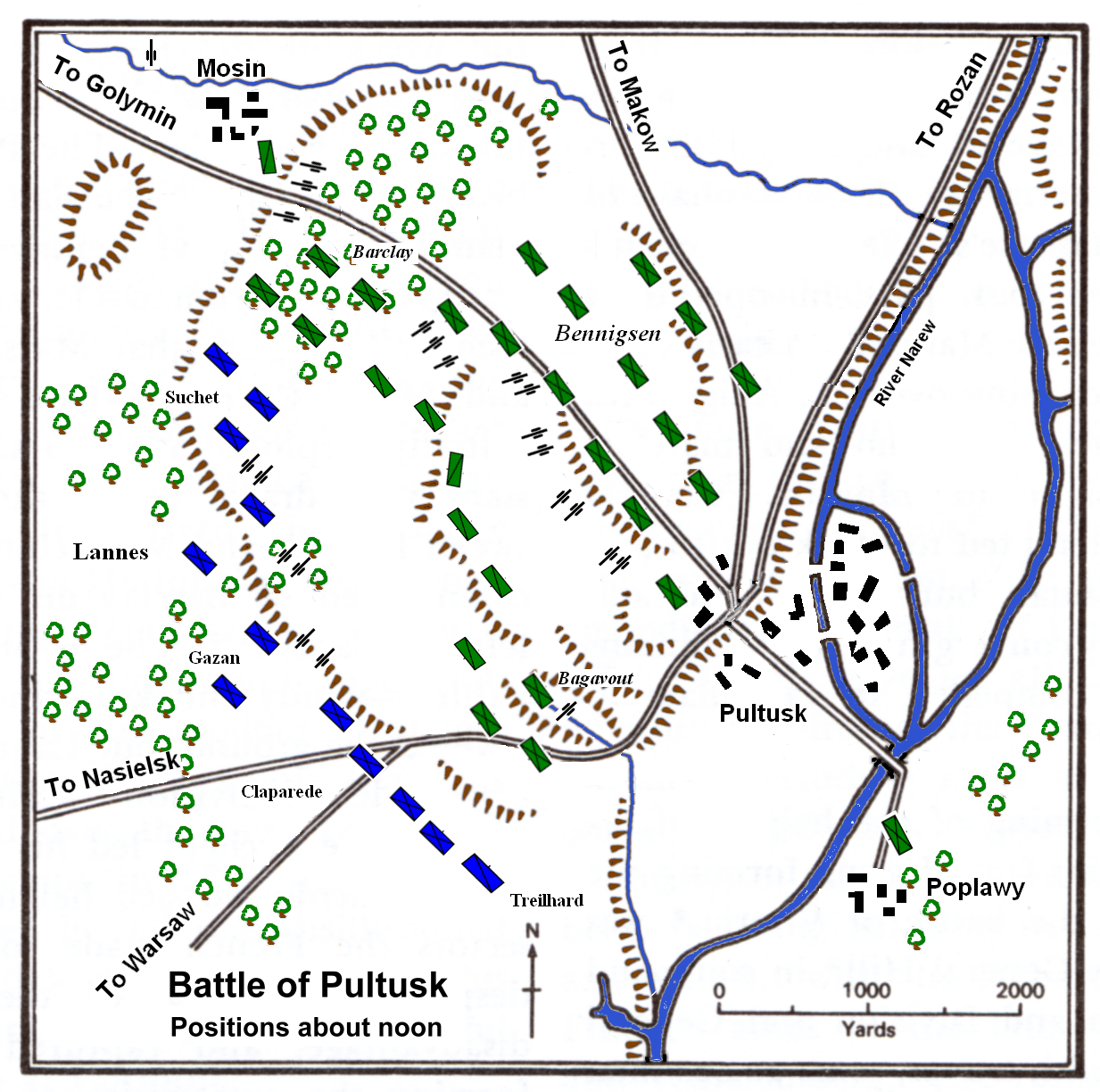
Battle of Pułtusk about noon

At the same time as the French right attacked, on the French left Suchet's division, led by Lannes in person, attacked the position held by Barclay. The initial attack drove the Russians out of the wood, and captured the battery stationed there, but Barclay's reserve drove the French back into the wood and recaptured the guns.

The French centre had also advanced. The Russian cavalry withdrew behind the main line, exposing the French to artillery fire from the Russian batteries.

By about 2 p.m. the French position looked dangerous. The Russian left had held, the French centre was suffering from the artillery fire, and on the right increasing pressure was beginning to force Suchet's men out of the wood. A French retreat looked a distinct possibility when unexpected reinforcements arrived.

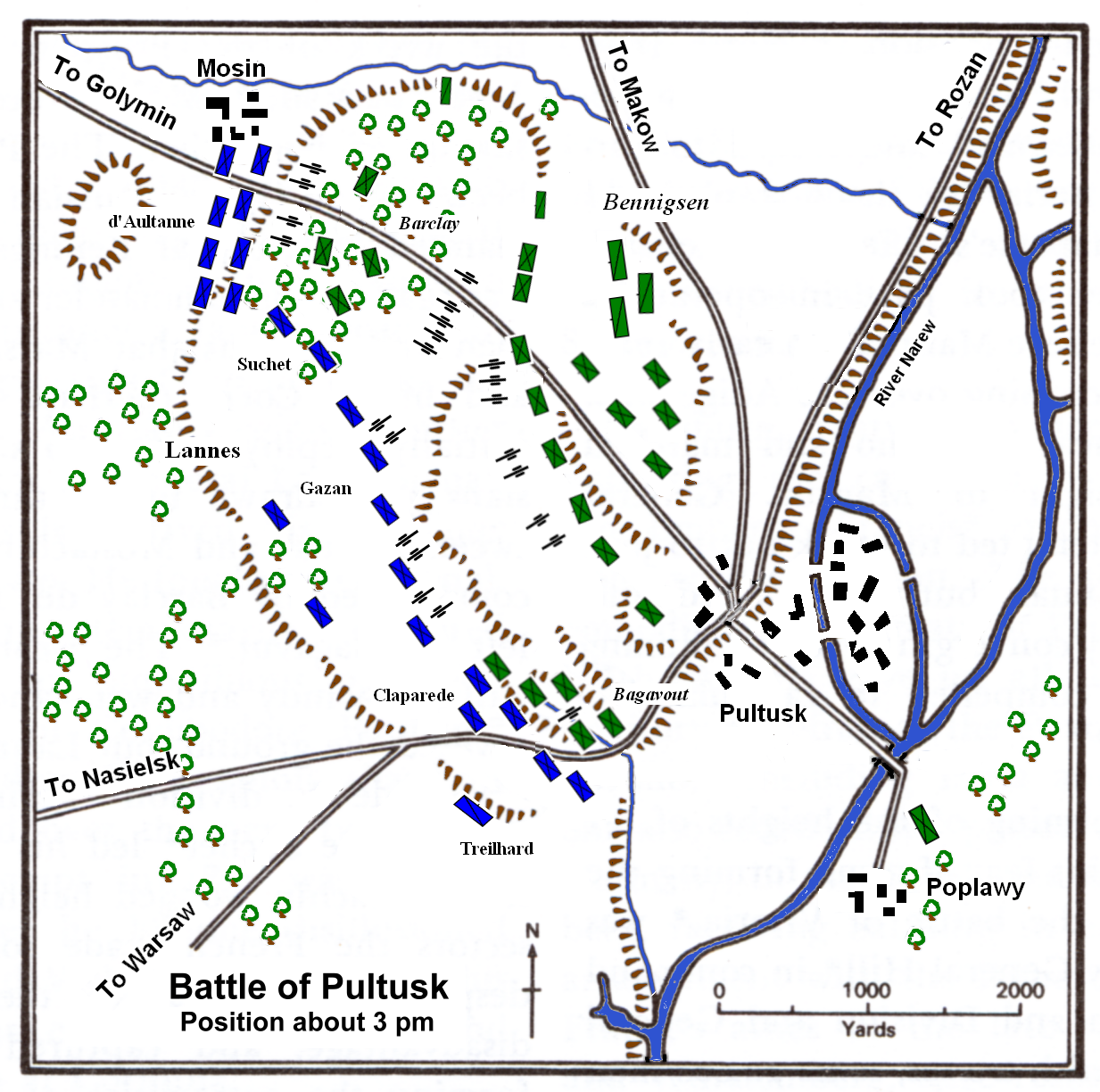
Battle of Pułtusk about 3 PM

The 3rd Division of Davout's 3rd Corps, temporarily commanded by his Chief of Staff Fournier, had been ordered to pursue a Russian column apparently retiring on Pułtusk. Concerned about the strength of the Russian cavalry force which was escorting guns and stores, Fournier had pursued but not engaged. He was preparing to stop for the night when he heard the sounds of combat to his right, and so marched his men towards Pułtusk. Due to the state of the roads he was only able to bring up one gun.

Seeing this force approach, Bennigsen wheeled back his main line to face the wood, thus reducing the artillery fire directed at Lannes's units. Barclay, finding Fournier attacking his right flank, fell back to the right of the main Russian line. Bennigsen reinforced him with two infantry regiments and some cavalry, and directed an artillery battery to fire on the wood. Thus reinforced Barclay attacked the wood. The French were driven out, and Fournier's right flank exposed. This was attacked by twenty squadrons of Russian cavalry, but the 85th French Infantry Regiment formed squares and by a steady fire drove the cavalry off. At about 8:00 PM the combat died away, and Fournier retired to the edge of the woods.

The arrival of Fournier's division also had an effect on the French right wing. With the switch of much of the Russian artillery to support Barclay de Tolly, the French were able to use their own guns to support a fresh attack at about 2:00 PM on Baggovut by the brigades of Claparède and Vedel, supported by Gazan on their left. Baggovut's men were driven back over the ravine in their rear, and their guns captured. Ostermann-Tolstoy established a battery to Barclay's right and reinforced by five battalions he attacked. After a desperate fight the French were thrown back and the guns recaptured. The French right and centre fell back to their start positions as night fell.

During the night, Bennigsen decided to retire, and did so the next day, 27 December, using the longer road to Różan along the east bank of the Narew. From there he continued his retreat to Ostrołęka. Fournier's division also moved off to rejoin the 3rd Corps at Golymin. Lannes was in no position to pursue the Russians, and occupied Pułtusk on 28 December.

== Analysis ==
Losses on both sides are disputed. Lannes claimed the Russians lost 2,000 killed, 3,000 wounded and 1,800 prisoners, a total of 6,800; Sir Robert Wilson, British liaison officer with the Russian army, claimed the Russians lost less than 5,000 men. Lannes undercounted and only admitted to 700 French killed and 1,500 wounded; Russian authorities said the French losses were 7,000 killed and wounded and 70 prisoners. Given that the French were attacking and exposed to artillery fire, a total for them of 7,000 killed, wounded and prisoners does not seem unreasonable, and a total of 5,000 casualties for the Russians seems a good estimate. Petre quotes the various authorities. Another authority gives French losses as five generals and 140 officers killed or wounded, 3,200 soldiers dead or wounded, and 700 captured. Russian losses are stated as 3,500 total, including 1,500 men and 12 guns captured. On the French side, Lannes, Bonnard, Claparède and Vedel were all wounded.

Bennigsen claimed a victory. The consensus seems to be that having decided to fight, in defiance of his orders he could have better disposed his forces, taken the offensive and destroyed Lannes's corps before Fournier came up. Bennigsen said he thought he was facing 60,000 French under Napoleon in person, which may explain his defensive stance. Bennigsen also complained that Buxhoeveden did not support him, but that officer was obeying his orders to retire.

Lannes, on the other hand, was following his orders, and the result was to find himself facing a superior force in a good defensive position. Napoleon's orders had not allowed for this, and unaware of the odds against him, Lannes attacked. If Fournier had not used his initiative and marched to the sound of the guns, the result may have been very different.

== Aftermath ==
At the Battle of Gołymin, Golitsyn successfully held off a superior French force. This, combined with the failure of Soult's corps to pass around the Russian right flank spoiled Napoleon's chances of cutting the Russian line of retreat and trapping them against the River Narew.

The Russian 5th and 7th Divisions retired towards the main body of the army at Różan. Bennigsen's forces fell back to Nowogród on the River Narew, uniting on 1 January 1807 with the forces under Buxhoeveden. On 28 December, Napoleon stopped his advance and, having lost contact with the Russian army, decided to go into winter quarters. His troops were exhausted and discontented, and the supply situation was in great disorder.

The break in hostilities did not last long. Soon afterward, Bennigsen was appointed army commander and he launched an unexpected winter offensive into East Prussia. Aimed at the French strategic left flank, the Russian blow was blunted at the Battle of Mohrungen on 25 January 1807. Napoleon immediately counterattacked, trying to cut the Russian communications line that ran to the northeast. The French caught up with the Russians on 7 and 8 February 1807 and the dreadful Battle of Eylau was fought.

== Popular culture ==
The battle is included in Leo Tolstoy's War and Peace.

== Notes ==
Preceded by Battle of Golymin	Napoleonic Wars; Battle of Pułtusk (1806)	Succeeded by Battle of Mohrungen
