= Pultusk (meteorite) =

Chondrite meteorite

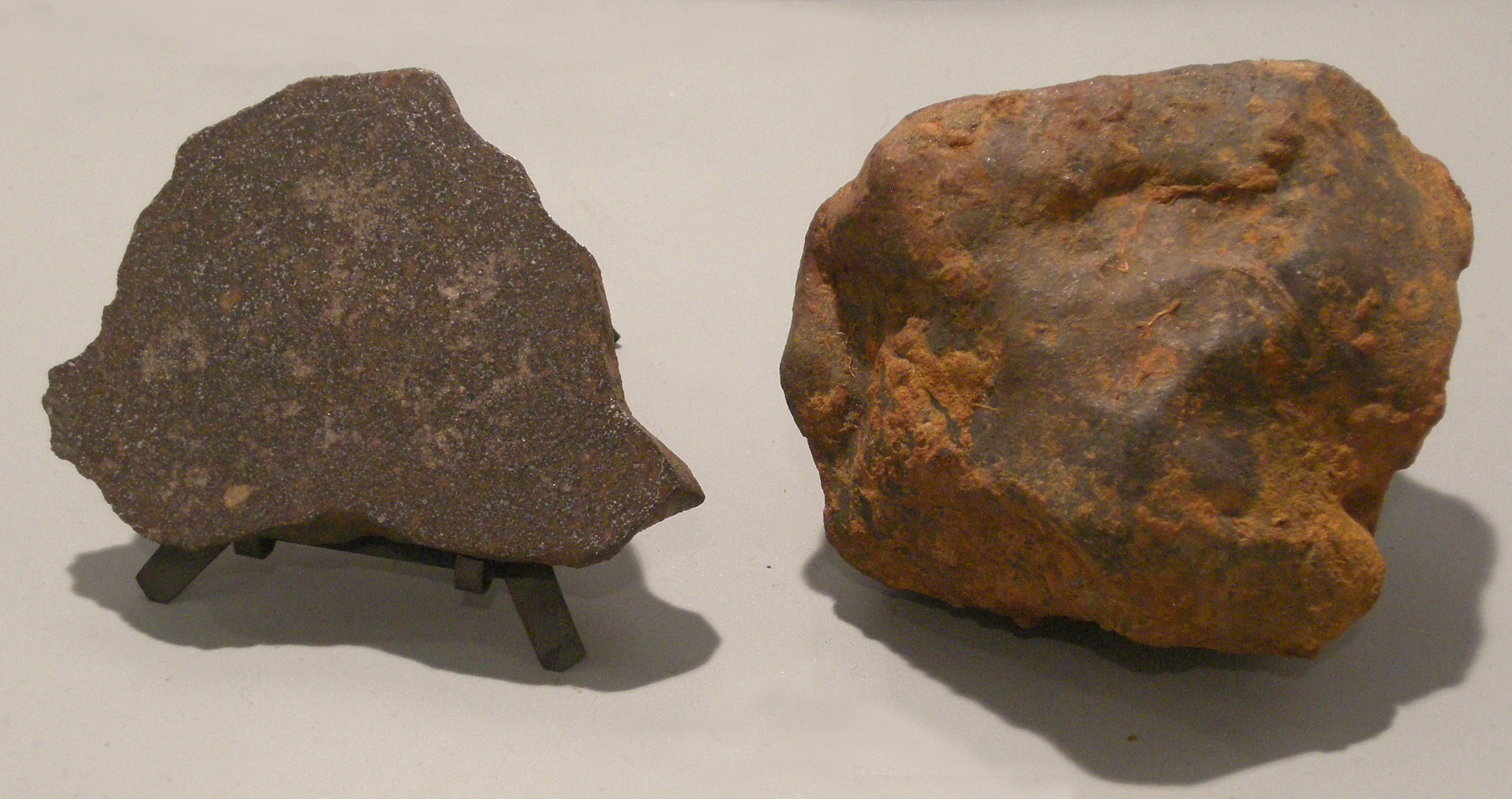
- Type: Chondrite
- Class: Ordinary chondrite
- Group: H5
- Composition: Olivine and bronzite, kamacite, troilite and chromite also present.
- Country: Poland
- Region: Ostrołęka
- Coordinates: 52°46′N 21°16′E
- Observed fall: Yes
- Fall date: 30 January 1868
- TKW: about 8,860 kilograms (19,530 lb; 9.77 short tons)
- Strewn field: Yes
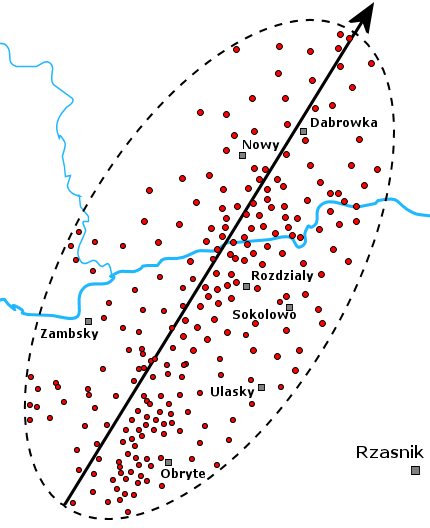
- Distribution ellipse of Pultusk fall.
- Related media on Wikimedia Commons

Pultusk is an H5 ordinary chondrite meteorite which fell on 30 January 1868 in Poland near the town of Pułtusk. The event has been known as the stony meteorite shower with the largest number of pieces yet recorded in history. Made up of rocky debris, it consists of pyroxene or olivine chondrules deployed in massive plagioclase. Kamacite is also reported.

== History ==
The fall occurred on 30 January 1868, at 7:00 pm near the town of Pułtusk, about 60 kilometres (37 mi) northeast of Warsaw. Thousands of people witnessed a large fireball followed by detonations and a very large shower of small fragments falling on ice, land and houses within an area of about 127 sq km (appx. 78 sq miles). The estimated number of fragments was 68,780. (Note: This statement has been contradicted by authors and scholars in the field of meteorite studies who estimated the number of fragments to be over 100,000, while other researchers have mentioned a misreading during the analysis of the chemical components and that a more precise number would be something no more than 3,000 stones. → Reynolds, Mike D. (2010). Falling Stars: A Guide to Meteors and Meteorites. Stackpole Books. p. 55. ISBN 978-0811736169. → Paneth, Fritz (1964). Chemistry and beyond: a selection. Interscience Publishers. p. 180. OCLC 522144.)

The fragments ranged in weight from half a gram to 9.095 kilograms (20.05 lb) (the largest specimen). The overall estimated mass of the meteorites was 8,863 kilograms (19,540 lb). The vast majority of the fragments were small (few grams), known as Pultusk Peas. The Pultusk meteorite is the largest stony meteorite shower ever recorded.

== Composition and classification ==
Pultusk is brecciated and contains two varieties of xenoliths embedded in a dark brecciated matrix. It is a veined and brecciated chondrite with abundant xenoliths with various degrees of recrystallisation. Petrologic type 5 xenoliths prevail, so it has been classified as H5, an ordinary chondrite significantly thermally metamorphosed and with the contours of the chondrules frequently difficult to distinguish. The main minerals are olivine and bronzite. Kamacite, troilite and chromite are also present.

=== Chemical composition ===
The chemical elements and the respective quantity found in the Pultusk meteorite.

The chemical elements and the respective quantity found in the Pultusk meteorite have been described as SiO_{2} 36.44 wt%, TiO_{2} 0.18 wt%, Al_{2}O_{3} 1.88 wt%, Cr_{2}O_{3} 0.37 wt%, FeO 9.48 wt%, MnO 0.25 wt%, MgO 23.75 wt%, CaO 1.82 wt%, Na_{2}O 0.83 wt%, K_{2}O 0.09 wt%, P_{2}O_{5} 0.22 wt%, Fe 16.02 wt%, Ni 1.61 wt%, FeS 5.97 wt%, Fe (metallic) 17.62 wt%, Ni (metallic) 9.13 wt%, Fe as iron sulfide 3.80 wt%, S as iron sulfide 2.17 wt%, total content of iron 27.19 wt%.

== See also ==
- Glossary of meteoritics
- Sikhote-Alin (meteorite)

== Gallery ==
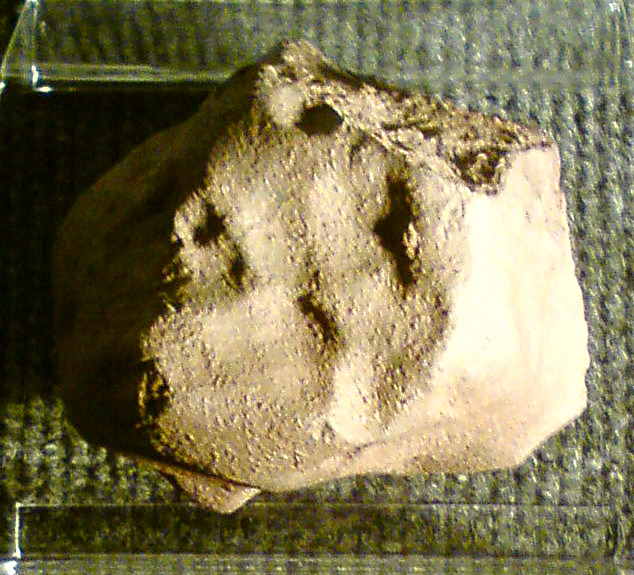
Pultusk fragment, Museum of Technology in Warsaw

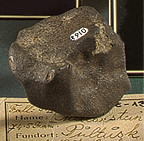
Pultusk fragment, 74.2 grams (2.62 ounces)

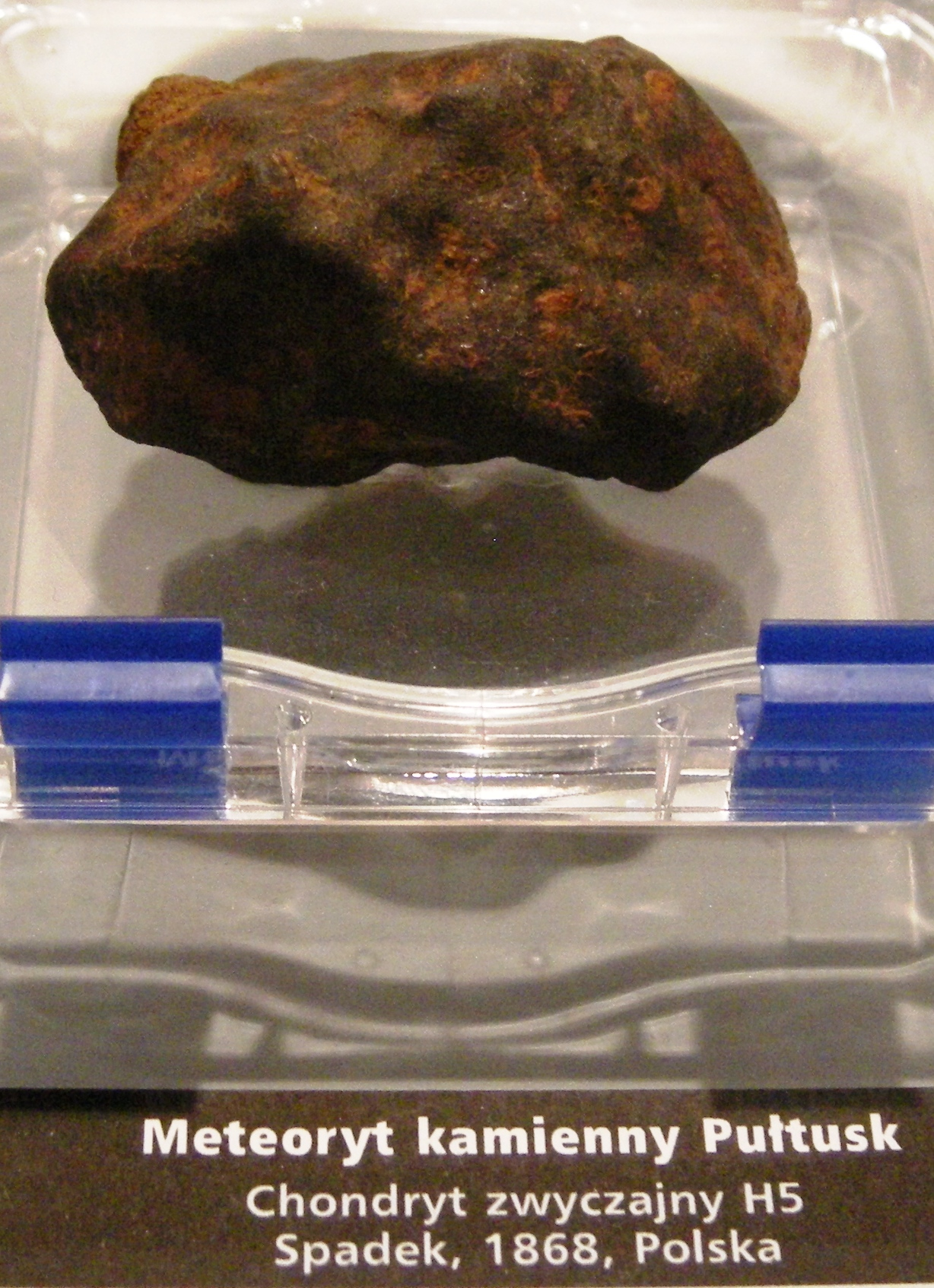
Picture taken at the temporary exhibition at the Museum of Technology, Warsaw.
