= Michel Claparède =

French general

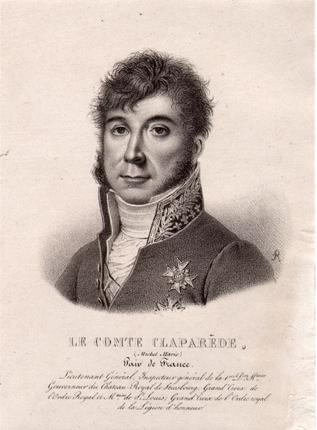
- Born: 28 August 1770; Gignac, Hérault
- Died: 23 October 1842 (aged 72); Montpellier
- Military career
- Allegiance: Kingdom of France, French First Republic, First French Empire, Kingdom of France
- Branch: Infantry
- Active: 1793–1842
- Rank: Général de division
- Conflicts: French Revolutionary Wars; Saint-Domingue expedition; Napoleonic Wars; Battle of Austerlitz; Battle of Saalfeld; Battle of Jena; Battle of Pułtusk; Battle of Ostrołęka; Battle of Ebersberg; Battle of Essling; Battle of Wagram; Battle of Borodino; Battle of Berezina
- Awards: Pair de France (1819), Légion d'honneur (Grand Cross); Ordre royal et militaire de Saint-Louis (Grand Cross)

Michel Marie Claparède (French pronunciation: [miʃɛl maʁi klapaʁɛd]; 28 August 1770, in Gignac – 23 October 1842, in Montpellier) was a French general.

== Life ==
Claparède enlisted in a battalion of volunteers in 1792. Having been promoted to captain he served under Napoleon Bonaparte in Italy. Having given command of a battalion in the Army of the Rhine, Claparède served at Hohenlinden. He took part in Charles Leclerc's failed expedition to Santo Domingo. Having been promoted to general de brigade he returned to France in 1804, where he joined the Grande Armée at Boulogne.

When the War of the Third Coalition started, Claparède commanded a brigade in Suchet's division from the V Corps of Marshal Lannes. With this unit he distinguished himself at Ulm, Austerlitz, Saalfeld, Jena, Pultusk and Ostrołęka. Having been promoted to general de division in October 1808, in the War of the Fifth Coalition, Claparède distinguished himself at the twin battles of Aspern-Essling and at Wagram. During the following years he served in Portugal and Spain but in 1812 he was recalled to the Grande Armée for the French invasion of Russia. In Russia he served at Smolensk, Borodino and the crossing of the Berezina. Having served in the 1813 German campaign and the 1814 French campaigns, he distinguished himself at Leipzig and Paris.

During the Bourbon Restoration Claparède served as inspector-general of the 1st military division and as Pair de France.His name is engraved on the Arc de Triomphe.

He was wounded at the Battles of Pułtusk and Berezina.

== Titles ==
- Comte de l'Empire by imperial decree of 19 March 1808 and letters patent of 29 June 1808
- Confirmed as a hereditary count by royal ordinance of 23 June 1816

== Bibliography ==
- Bouillet, Marie-Nicolas; Chassang, Alexis, eds. (1878). Dictionnaire Bouillet (in French).;
- Mullié, Charles (1852). "CLAPARÈDE (MICHEL)" . Biographie des célébrités militaires des armées de terre et de mer de 1789 à 1850 (in French). Paris: Poignavant et Compagnie.;
- "Michel Claparède", in Adolphe Robert and Gaston Cougny, Dictionnaire des parlementaires français (1789–1891), Bourloton, Paris, 1889 Edition details Wikisource.
