= Tomasz Nałęcz =

Polish politician

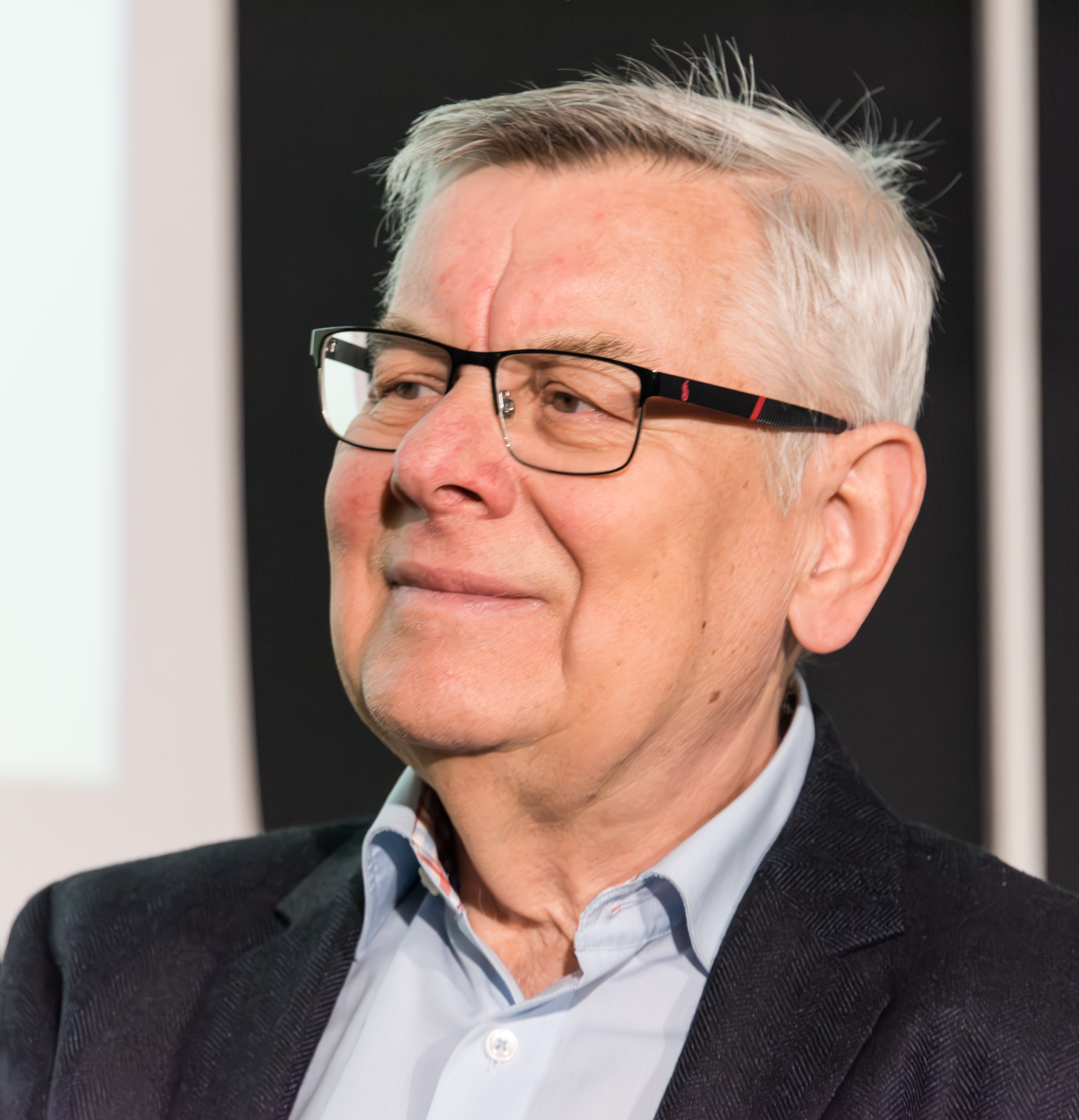
Tomasz Nałęcz

Tomasz Nałęcz [ˈtɔmaʂ ˈnawɛnt͡ʂ] (born 29 October 1949 in Gołymin) is a Polish historian, leftist politician, former vice-Speaker of the Sejm, a former member of the Social Democracy of Poland party (SdPl) In the past he used to be member of the communist Polish United Workers' Party (PZPR) (1970–1990) and later its social-democratic successor, Social Democracy of the Republic of Poland. In the years 1993-2004 he was a prominent member of Labour Union. He left the Labour Union after SdPl was founded by Marek Borowski.

In 2003–2004 Nałęcz was also the chairman of the Sejm's special parliamentary inquiring committee which tried to unravel the Lew Rywin affair.

In December 2009 Nałęcz was selected as the SdPl's candidate for the election due to take place in autumn 2010. However, following the Smolensk plane crash which killed incumbent president Lech Kaczyński and brought forward the election to June, Nałęcz withdrew from the contest.

== Works ==
- Polska Organizacja Wojskowa 1914–1918 (1984)
- Irredenta polska (1987)
- Rządy Sejmu 1921–1926 (1991)
- Spór o kształt demokracji i parlamentaryzmu w Polsce w latach 1921-1926 (1994)
- Historia XX wieku (2000)

== See also ==
- Politics of Poland
- List of political parties in Poland
- List of politicians in Poland
