= Joseph Augustin Fournier =

French military general (1759–1828)

Joseph Augustin Fournier de Loysonville, marquis d'Aultane, often called Joseph Daultanne, Marquis d'Aultane (1759–1828), was a general of division of the French First Republic, and fought in the French Revolutionary Wars and the Napoleonic Wars, where he distinguished himself at Pułtusk. He was born at Valréas (Vaucluse), 18 August 1759. Louis XVIII confirmed his rank of Marquis, and he continued in Bourbon service after the conclusion of the Hundred Days. He retired to his estates in the department of Vaucluse, and died 7 January 1828. His name is inscribed on the Arc de Triomphe, on the West column.
