= Ruszkowo, Ciechanów County =

Ruszkowo
- Village
- Location within Poland
- Coordinates: 52°48′N 20°50′E
- Country: Poland
- Voivodeship: Masovian
- County: Ciechanów
- Gmina: Gołymin-Ośrodek

Ruszkowo [ruʂˈkɔvɔ] is a village in the administrative district of Gmina Gołymin-Ośrodek, within Ciechanów County, Masovian Voivodeship, in east-central Poland.
