= Gołymin =

Coordinates: 52°48′25″N 20°52′28″E

Gołymin [ɡɔˈwɨmin] is a village in Poland, approximately 70 kilometres (43 mi) north of Warsaw. It is now divided into three sołectwos: Gołymin-Ośrodek ("Gołymin Centre"; the seat of the local municipality, called Gmina Gołymin-Ośrodek), Gołymin-Północ ("Gołymin North") and Gołymin-Południe ("Gołymin South").

Gołymin is the birthplace of politician Tomasz Nałęcz. It was also the site of the Battle of Gołymin (1806).
