= 2010 UCI Cyclo-cross World Championships – Men's under-23 race =

Men's Under-23 Cyclo-cross Race
2010 UCI Cyclo-cross World Championships
- Rainbow jersey

Race details
- Dates: January 30, 2010
- Stages: 1
- Distance: 21.86 km/h (13.58 mph)
- Winning time: 55' 58"

Medalists
	Gold	Arnaud Jouffroy (FRA)
	Silver	Tom Meeusen (BEL)
	Bronze	Marek Konwa (POL)

This event was held on Saturday 30 January 2010 in Tábor, Czech Republic as a part of the 2010 UCI Cyclo-cross World Championships. The length of the course was 21.86 km (0.16 km + 7 laps of 3.10 km each).

At first, the brothers Pawel and Kacper Szczepaniak (from Poland) occupied the gold, and silver medals, respectively. However, in March 2010 they were found guilty of doping and thus disqualified.

== Ranking ==
Rank	Cyclist	Time
Gold medal	Arnaud Jouffroy (FRA)	55:58
Silver medal	Tom Meeusen (BEL)	+ 0:25
Bronze medal	Marek Konwa (POL)	+ 0:35
4	Arnaud Grand (SUI)	+ 0:37
5	Robert Gavenda (SVK)	+ 0:39
6	Sascha Weber (GER)	+ 0:48
7	Tijmen Eising (NED)	+ 0:59
8	Elia Silvestri (ITA)	+ 1:06
9	Matteo Trentin (ITA)	+ 1:12
10	Lars Van Der Haar (NED)	+ 1:12
11	Kenneth Van Compernolle (BEL)	+ 1:18
12	Vincent Baestaens (BEL)	+ 1:24
13	Jiri Polnicky (CZE)	+ 1:32
14	Micki Van Empel (NED)	+ 1:47
15	Lubomir Petrus (CZE)	+ 1:48
16	Marcel Meisen (GER)	+ 1:49
17	David Lozano Riba (ESP)	+ 1:56
18	Corne Van Kessel (NED)	+ 2:22
19	Matthias Rupp (SUI)	+ 2:26
20	Cristian Cominelli (ITA)	+ 2:31
21	Jan Nesvadba (CZE)	+ 2:31
22	Matthieu Boulo (FRA)	+ 2:40
23	Valentin Scherz (SUI)	+ 2:44
24	Jim Aernouts (BEL)	+ 2:51
25	Bryan Falaschi (ITA)	+ 3:18
26	Zach Mcdonald (USA)	+ 3:19
27	Daniel Summerhill (USA)	+ 3:26
28	Mattias Nilsson (SWE)	+ 3:29
29	Ole Quast (GER)	+ 3:31
30	Karel Hnik (CZE)	+ 3:31
31	Joeri Adams (BEL)	+ 3:31
32	David Hackworth (USA)	+ 3:59
33	David Menger (CZE)	+ 4:11
34	Yu Takenouchi (JPN)	+ 4:16
35	Pit Schlechter (LUX)	+ 4:23
36	Jerome Townsend (USA)	+ 4:35
37	Michael (Jr) Schweizer (GER)	+ 4:42
38	Marek Canecky (SVK)	+ 5:08
39	Irwin Gras (FRA)	+ 5:50
40	Kenneth Hansen (DEN)	+ 5:53
41	Matej Medved (SVK)	+ 6:00
42	Luke Keough (USA)	+ 6:06
43	Naran Khangarid (MGL)	+ 6:23
44	Mitchell Huenders (NED)	+ 6:24
45	Jonas Schau Guddal (DEN)	+ 6:29
46	Melvin Rulliere (FRA)	+ 6:58
47	Daniel Ruiz Etxeandia (ESP)	+ 7:04
48	Hikaru Kosaka (JPN)	+ 7:50
49	David Puskas (HUN)	+ 8:04
50	Fabian Danner (GER)	+ 8:08
51	Baasankhuu Myagmarsuren (MGL)	+ 8:13
52	Jared Stafford (CAN)	Lapped
53	Inigo Gomez Elorriaga (ESP)	Lapped
54	Jan Denuwelaere (BEL)	Lapped
55	Andrey Ryzhkov (KAZ)	Lapped
