= 2009 UCI Cyclo-cross World Championships – Men's under-23 race =

Men's Under-23 Cyclo-cross Race
2009 UCI Cyclo-cross World Championships
- Rainbow jersey

Race details
- Dates: January 31, 2009
- Stages: 1
- Winning time: 52' 48"

Medalists
	Gold	Philipp Walsleben (GER)
	Silver	Christoph Pfingsten (GER)
	Bronze	Pawel Szczepaniak (POL)

This event was held on Saturday January 31, 2009 as part of the 2009 UCI Cyclo-cross World Championships in Hoogerheide, Netherlands.

== Ranking ==
Rank	Cyclist	Time
Gold medal	Philipp Walsleben (GER)	52:48
Silver medal	Christoph Pfingsten (GER)	+ 0:21
Bronze medal	Pawel Szczepaniak (POL)	+ 0:21
4	Cristian Cominelli (ITA)	+ 0:21
5	Sascha Weber (GER)	+ 0:24
6	Quentin Bertholet (BEL)	+ 0:25
7	Guillaume Perrot (FRA)	+ 0:29
8	Ramon Sinkeldam (NED)	+ 0:30
9	Clément Bourgoin (FRA)	+ 0:30
10	Marek Konwa (POL)	+ 0:33
11	Aurelien Duval (FRA)	+ 0:34
12	Matteo Trentin (ITA)	+ 0:41
13	Matthieu Boulo (FRA)	+ 0:42
14	Vincent Baestaens (BEL)	+ 0:43
15	Arnaud Jouffroy (FRA)	+ 0:44
16	Kenneth Van Compernolle (BEL)	+ 0:45
17	David Fletcher (GBR)	+ 0:59
18	Marcel Meisen (GER)	+ 1:09
19	Mitchell Huenders (NED)	+ 1:11
20	Robert Gavenda (SVK)	+ 1:20
21	Jiri Polnicky (CZE)	+ 1:20
22	Twan Van Den Brand (NED)	+ 1:25
23	Ole Quast (GER)	+ 1:29
24	Micki Van Empel (NED)	+ 1:33
25	Arnaud Grand (SUI)	+ 1:33
26	Sylwester Janiszewski (POL)	+ 1:35
27	Bjørn Selander (USA)	+ 1:36
28	Marco Ponta (ITA)	+ 1:41
29	Tom Meeusen (BEL)	+ 1:43
30	Boy Van Poppel (NED)	+ 1:44
31	Jim Aernouts (BEL)	+ 2:01
32	Daniel Summerhill (USA)	+ 2:09
33	Mattias Nilsson (SWE)	+ 2:10
34	Alessandro Calderan (ITA)	+ 2:21
35	Jonathan Mcevoy (GBR)	+ 2:26
36	Yu Takenouchi (JPN)	+ 2:42
37	Ondrej Bambula (CZE)	+ 2:54
38	Julien Taramarcaz (SUI)	+ 3:04
39	Nicholas Keough (USA)	+ 3:09
40	Kacper Szczepaniak (POL)	+ 3:12
41	Pit Schlechter (LUX)	+ 3:26
42	William Dugan (USA)	+ 3:41
43	Hikaru Kosaka (JPN)	+ 3:42
44	Lukas Prihoda (CZE)	+ 3:55
45	Elia Silvestri (ITA)	+ 4:03
46	Tomasz Repinski (POL)	+ 4:05
47	Andrew Thomas (CAN)	+ 4:06
48	Mauro Gonzalez Fontan (ESP)	+ 4:06
49	Nicholas Weighall (USA)	+ 5:08
50	Romain Beney (SUI)	+ 5:15
51	Lucian Logigan (ROU)	+ 5:26
52	Robert Bachraty (SVK)	+ 5:30
53	Brian Robinson (CAN)	Lapped
54	Timofei Ivanov (RUS)	Lapped
55	Kyle Fry (CAN)	Lapped
