= 2011 UCI Cyclo-cross World Championships – Men's under-23 race =

Men's Under-23 Cyclo-cross Race
2011 UCI Cyclo-cross World Championships
- Rainbow jersey

Race details
- Dates: January 29, 2011
- Stages: 1
- Winning time: 52'01"

Medalists
	Gold	Lars Van Der Haar (NED)
	Silver	Mike Teunissen (NED)
	Bronze	Karel Hnik (CZE)

This event was held on Saturday 29 January 2011 as part of the 2011 UCI Cyclo-cross World Championships in Sankt Wendel, Germany.

== Ranking ==
Rank	Cyclist	Time
Gold medal	Lars Van Der Haar (NED)	52:01
Silver medal	Mike Teunissen (NED)	+ 0:01
Bronze medal	Karel Hnik (CZE)	+ 0:01
4	Matthieu Boulo (FRA)	+ 0:03
5	Tijmen Eising (NED)	+ 0:04
6	Wietse Bosmans (BEL)	+ 0:07
7	Valentin Scherz (SUI)	+ 0:13
8	Joeri Adams (BEL)	+ 0:24
9	Jimmy Turgis (FRA)	+ 0:24
10	Vincent Baestaens (BEL)	+ 0:30
11	Marcel Meisen (GER)	+ 0:36
12	Irwin Gras (FRA)	+ 0:39
13	Daniel Summerhill (USA)	+ 0:42
14	Vinnie Braet (BEL)	+ 0:58
15	Marek Konwa (POL)	+ 1:01
16	Twan Van Den Brand (NED)	+ 1:01
17	Kenneth Hansen (DEN)	+ 1:24
18	Mirko Tabacchi (ITA)	+ 1:24
19	Tomas Paprstka (CZE)	+ 1:34
20	Jim Aernouts (BEL)	+ 1:54
21	Michael Boros (CZE)	+ 2:13
22	Jon Ander Insausti Irastorza (ESP)	+ 2:16
23	Zach Mcdonald (USA)	+ 2:21
24	Ole Quast (GER)	+ 2:35
25	Michael Winterberg (SUI)	+ 2:37
26	Kenta Gallagher (GBR)	+ 2:40
27	Arnaud Grand (SUI)	+ 3:15
28	Max Walsleben (GER)	+ 3:28
29	Micki Van Empel (NED)	+ 3:35
30	Michael (Jr) Schweizer (GER)	+ 4:14
31	Vincent Dias Dos Santos (LUX)	+ 4:17
32	Jan Nesvadba (CZE)	+ 4:18
33	Matteo Trentin (ITA)	+ 4:20
34	Alexander Gehbauer (AUT)	+ 5:03
35	Jesper Dahlström (SWE)	+ 5:05
36	Cody Kaiser (USA)	+ 5:05
37	Lubomir Petrus (CZE)	+ 5:22
38	Daniel Ruiz Etxeandia (ESP)	+ 5:36
39	Jerome Townsend (USA)	+ 5:46
40	Lukas Müller (SUI)	Lapped
41	Eduard Michael Grosu (ROU)	Lapped
42	Pit Schlechter (LUX)	Lapped
43	Luke Gray (GBR)	Lapped
44	Wojciech Herba (POL)	Lapped
45	Fabian Danner (GER)	Lapped
46	Elia Silvestri (ITA)	Lapped
47	Bartosz Pilis (POL)	Lapped
