= 2008 UCI Cyclo-cross World Championships – Men's junior race =

Men's Junior Cyclo-cross Race
2008 UCI Cyclo-cross World Championships
- Rainbow jersey

Race details
- Dates: January 26, 2008
- Stages: 1
- Winning time: 40' 30"

Medalists
	Gold	Arnaud Jouffroy (FRA)
	Silver	Peter Sagan (SVK)
	Bronze	Lubomir Petrus (CZE)

This event was held on Saturday 26 January 2008 as part of the 2008 UCI Cyclo-cross World Championships in Treviso, Italy.

== Ranking ==
Rank	Cyclist	Time
Gold medal	Arnaud Jouffroy (FRA)	40:30.00
Silver medal	Peter Sagan (SVK)	+ 0:01.14
Bronze medal	Lubomir Petrus (CZE)	+ 0:04.83
4	Elia Silvestri (ITA)	+ 0:54.53
5	Matthias Rupp (SUI)	+ 0:55.69
6	Pierre Garson (FRA)	+ 1:07.13
7	Stef Boden (BEL)	+ 1:08.27
8	Sean De Bie (BEL)	+ 1:11.24
9	Jonathan Cessot (FRA)	+ 1:11.53
10	Luke Keough (USA)	+ 1:12.82
11	Massimo Coledan (ITA)	+ 1:18.40
12	Michael Winterberg (SUI)	+ 1:43.14
13	Karel Hnik (CZE)	+ 1:45.50
14	Marek Konwa (POL)	+ 1:47.81
15	Vincent Dias Dos Santos (LUX)	+ 1:48.68
16	Tijmen Eising (NED)	+ 1:54.24
17	Arnaud Grand (SUI)	+ 2:01.26
18	Valentin Scherz (SUI)	+ 2:02.03
19	Jasper Ockeloen (NED)	+ 2:10.92
20	Luca Braidot (ITA)	+ 2:18.33
21	Filip Adel (CZE)	+ 2:20.73
22	Pit Schlechter (LUX)	+ 2:26.52
23	Kacper Szczepaniak (POL)	+ 2:32.75
24	Andrzej Bartkiewicz (POL)	+ 2:34.60
25	Fabio Aru (ITA)	+ 2:35.30
26	Petr Marvan (CZE)	+ 2:39.93
27	Lars Van Der Haar (NED)	+ 2:52.33
28	Michael (Jr) Schweizer (GER)	+ 2:56.30
29	Max Walsleben (GER)	+ 3:00.07
30	Kevin Smit (NED)	+ 3:00.39
31	Matthias Bossuyt (BEL)	+ 3:01.75
32	Gavin Mannion (USA)	+ 3:09.39
33	Valentin Hadoux (FRA)	+ 3:09.96
34	Sebastian Batchelor (GBR)	+ 3:14.93
35	Fernando San Emeterio Gandiaga (ESP)	+ 3:16.78
36	Wietse Bosmans (BEL)	+ 3:17.28
37	Kazuya Nakayama (JPN)	+ 3:18.28
38	Andrew Williams (GBR)	+ 3:24.80
39	Toni Bretschneider (GER)	+ 3:26.59
40	Steve Fisher (USA)	+ 3:38.38
41	Ramon Domene Reyes (ESP)	+ 3:38.81
42	Zach Mc Donald (USA)	+ 3:40.03
43	Clément Koretzky (FRA)	+ 3:46.43
44	Igor Merino Cortazar (ESP)	+ 3:51.92
45	Jakub Friml (CZE)	+ 3:59.19
46	Geert Van Der Horst (NED)	+ 4:04.14
47	Josep Nadal Magrinya (ESP)	+ 4:06.24
48	Simon Geets (BEL)	+ 4:06.79
49	David Larson (CAN)	+ 4:18.10
50	Kamil Gradek (POL)	+ 4:32.82
51	Hamish Creber (GBR)	+ 4:46.25
52	Anthony Grand (SUI)	+ 5:11.65
53	Eric Emsky (USA)	+ 5:49.27
54	Alex Paton (GBR)	+ 5:53.18
55	Inigo Gomez Elorriaga (ESP)	+ 5:58.70
56	Max Michely (LUX)	+ 6:19.67
57	Patrik Stenberg (SWE)	+ 6:25.16
58	Bartosz Rajkowski (POL)	+ 6:58.51
59	Domenico Maria Salviani (ITA)	+ 8:57.07
60	Masatsugu Takamiya (JPN)	1 LAP
61	Viktor Prozirai (UKR)	1 LAP
