= 2012 UCI Cyclo-cross World Championships – Men's under-23 race =

Men's Under-23 Cyclo-cross Race
2012 UCI Cyclo-cross World Championships
- Rainbow jersey

Race details
- Dates: January 28, 2012
- Stages: 1
- Distance: 20.65 km (12.83 mi)
- Winning time: 49' 20"

Medalists
| | Gold | Lars van der Haar (NED) |
| | Silver | Wietse Bosmans (BEL) |
| | Bronze | Michiel van der Heijden (NED) |

This event was held on Saturday 28 January 2012 as part of the 2012 UCI Cyclo-cross World Championships. Seven laps had to be completed, totalling up to 20.65 kilometre.

== Ranking ==
| Rank | Cyclist | Time |
|---|---|---|
| Gold medal | Lars van der Haar (NED) | 49' 20" |
| Silver medal | Wietse Bosmans (BEL) | + 1" |
| Bronze medal | Michiel van der Heijden (NED) | + 4" |
| 4 | Arnaud Jouffroy (FRA) | + 5" |
| 5 | Laurens Sweeck (BEL) | + 50" |
| 6 | Marek Konwa (POL) | + 56" |
| 7 | Mike Teunissen (NED) | + 1'03" |
| 8 | Arnaud Grand (SUI) | + 1'13" |
| 9 | David Menut (FRA) | s.t. |
| 10 | Gianni Vermeersch (BEL) | + 1'28" |
| 11 | Vinnie Braet (BEL) | + 1'28" |
| 12 | Zach McDonald (USA) | + 1'48" |
| 13 | David Van Der Poel (NED) | + 1'55" |
| 14 | Julian Alaphilippe (FRA) | + 2'04" |
| 15 | Stan Godrie (NED) | + 2'07" |
| 16 | Tomas Paprstka (CZE) | + 2'08" |
| 17 | Vojtech Nipl (CZE) | + 2'17" |
| 18 | Clément Venturini (FRA) | + 2'30" |
| 19 | Elia Silvestri (ITA) | + 2'49" |
| 20 | Jan Nesvadba (CZE) | + 2'50" |
| 21 | Bryan Falaschi (ITA) | + 3'18" |
| 22 | Karel Hnik (CZE) | + 3'21" |
| 23 | Michael Schweizer (JR) (GER) | + 3'22" |
| 24 | Lars Forster (SUI) | + 3'39" |
| 25 | Kenneth Hansen (DEN) | + 3'42" |
| 26 | Michael Vanthourenhout (BEL) | + 4'04" |
| 27 | Igor Smarzaro (ITA) | + 4'07" |
| 28 | Micki Van Empel (NED) | + 4'13" |
| 29 | Yannick Eckmann (GER) | + 4'14" |
| 30 | Kenta Gallagher (GBR) | + 4'20" |
| 31 | Max Walsleben (GER) | + 4'22" |
| 32 | Fabian Lienhard (SUI) | + 4'41" |
| 33 | Michael Wildhaber (SUI) | + 4'41" |
| 34 | Daniele Braidot (ITA) | + 5'44" |
| 35 | Emil Arvid Olsen (DEN) | + 5'50" |
| 36 | Luca Braidot (ITA) | 1 LAP |
| 37 | Jonathan Lastra Martinez (ESP) | 1 LAP |
| 38 | Cody Kaiser (USA) | 1 LAP |
| 39 | Yannick Mayer (GER) | 1 LAP |
| 40 | Jack Clarkson (GBR) | 1 LAP |
| 41 | Pablo Rodriguez Guede (ESP) | 1 LAP |
| 42 | Wojciech Malec (POL) | 2 LAPS |
| 43 | Jon Gomez Elorriaga (ESP) | 2 LAPS |
| 44 | Patryk Kostecki (POL) | 2 LAPS |
| 45 | Inigo Gomez Elorriaga (ESP) | 3 LAPS |
| 46 | Felix Coté Bouvette (CAN) | 3 LAPS |
| 47 | Lex Reichling (LUX) | 3 LAPS |
| 48 | Ludwig Söderquist (SWE) | 3 LAPS |
| 49 | Bartosz Pilis (POL) | 3 LAPS |
| 50 | Jaroslav Chalas (SVK) | 3 LAPS |
| 51 | Alexander Gehbauer (AUT) | 3 LAPS |
| 52 | Luke Gray (GBR) | 3 LAPS |
| 53 | Domas Manikas (LIT) | 4 LAPS |
