= 2007 UCI Cyclo-cross World Championships – Men's under-23 race =

Men's Under-23 Cyclo-cross Race
2007 UCI Cyclo-cross World Championships
- Rainbow jersey

Race details
- Dates: January 27, 2007
- Stages: 1
- Winning time: 53' 53"

Medalists
	Gold	Lars Boom (NED)
	Silver	Niels Albert (BEL)
	Bronze	Romain Villa (FRA)

The 2007 UCI Cyclo-cross World Championships – Men's under-23 race was held on Saturday 27 January 2007 as a part of the 2007 UCI Cyclo-cross World Championships in Hooglede-Gits, Belgium.

== Summary ==
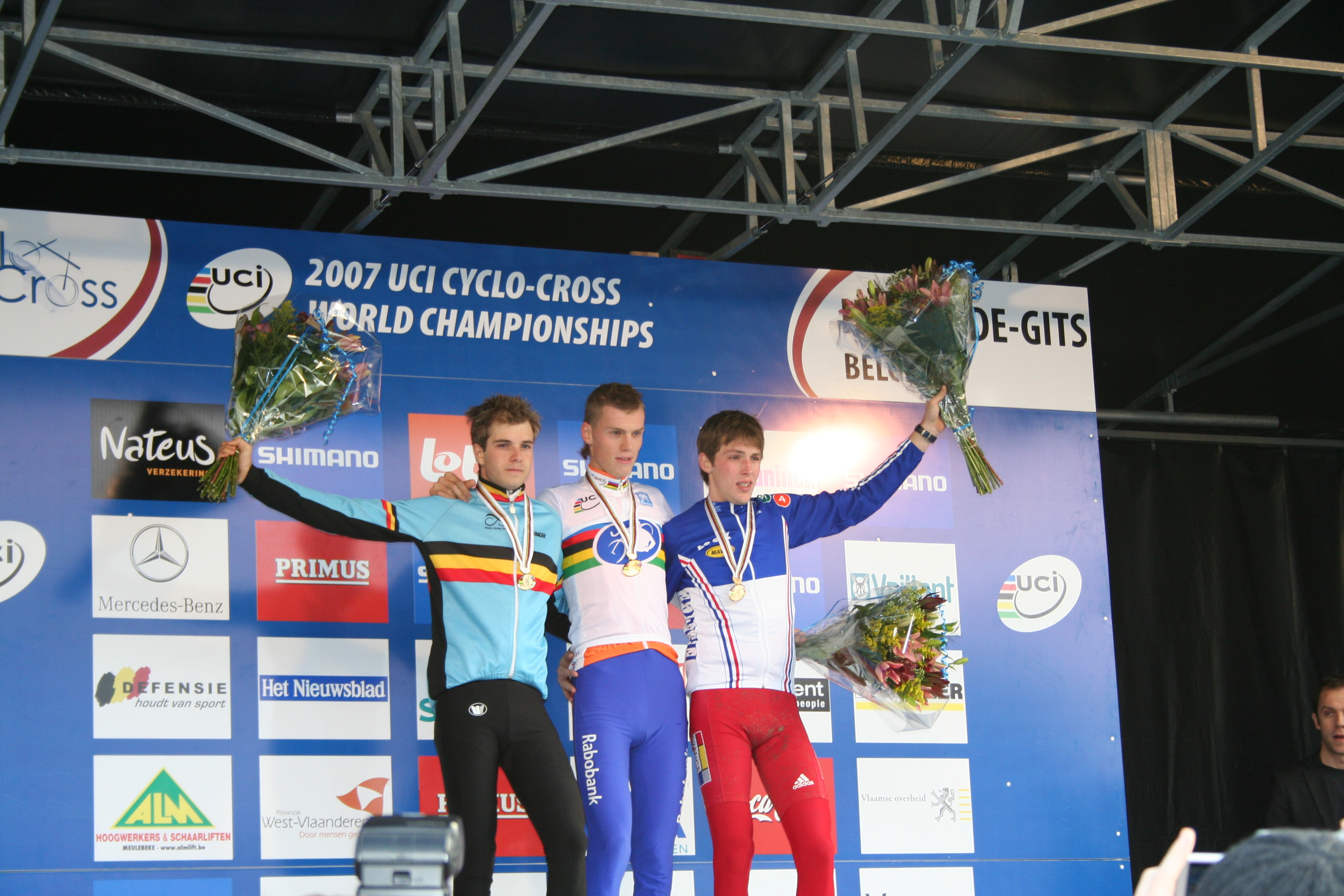
Under 23s podium

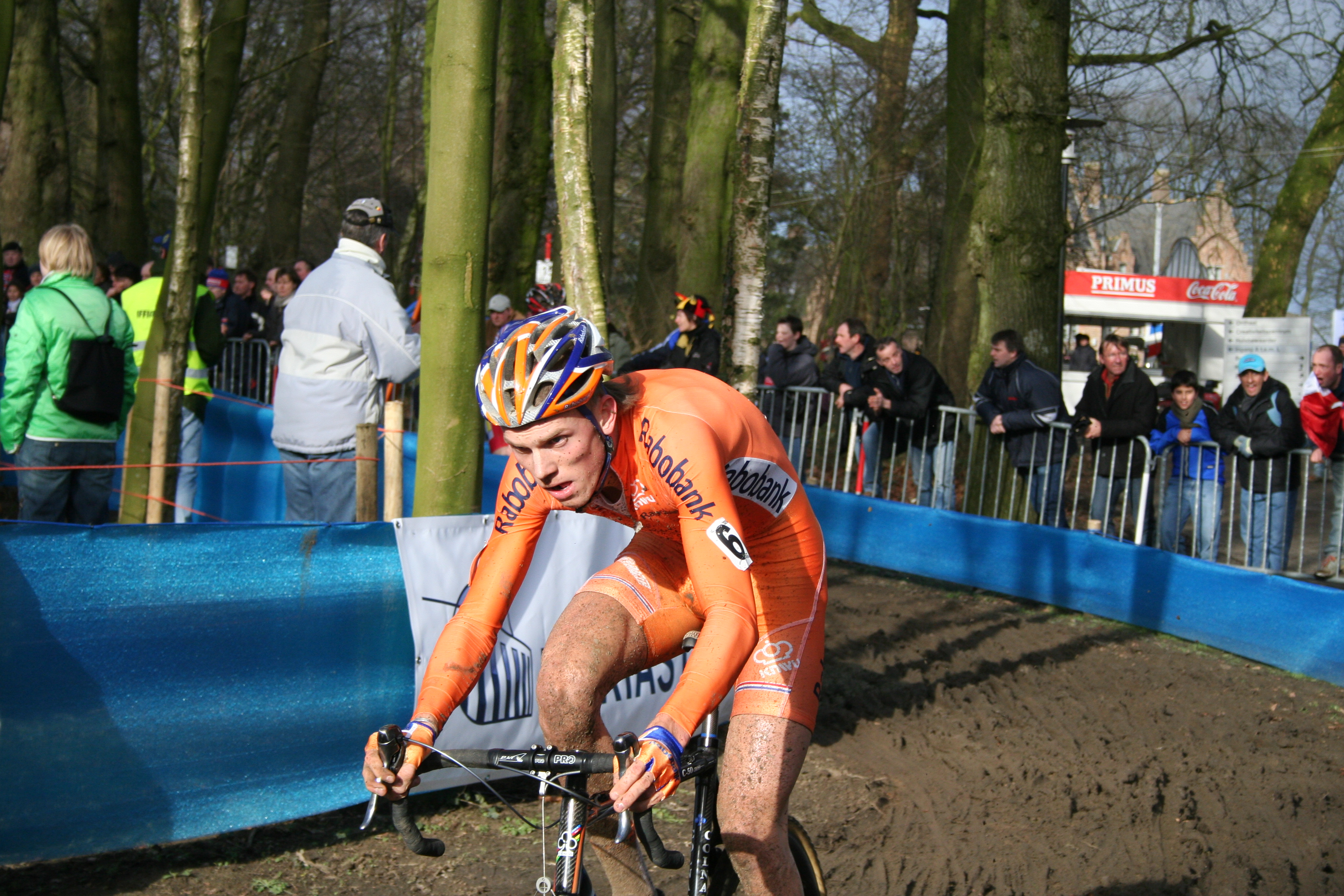
Lars Boom wins the U23s race

Lars Boom attacked on the hard climb halfway the second lap and managed to create a serious gap by drilling himself through the 35-metre-long sand section just after the climb. His main opponent Niels Albert followed on a fair distance and could only secure his silver medal, finishing 1:22 behind Boom. Romain Villa followed 20 seconds behind Albert to take the bronze.

== Ranking ==
Rank	Cyclist	Time
Gold medal	Lars Boom (NED)	53:53,4
Silver medal	Niels Albert (BEL)	+ 1:22,5
Bronze medal	Romain Villa (FRA)	+ 1:44,1
4	Zdenek Stybar (CZE)	+ 2:29,4
5	Philipp Walsleben (GER)	+ 2:49,1
6	Lukas Kloucek (CZE)	+ 2:56,0
7	Jonathan Lopez (FRA)	+ 3:04,3
8	Rob Peeters (BEL)	+ 3:10,1
9	Rafael Visinelli (ITA)	+ 3:22,5
10	Ricardo Van Der Velde (NED)	+ 3:25,8
11	Finn Heitmann (GER)	+ 3:37,5
12	Aurelien Duval (FRA)	+ 3:39,6
13	Robert Gavenda (SVK)	+ 4:23,8
14	Eddy Van Ijzendoorn (NED)	+ 4:45,2
15	Tom Van Den Bosch (BEL)	+ 4:55,5
16	Ian Field (GBR)	+ 5:02,3
17	Quentin Bertholet (BEL)	+ 5:07,2
18	František Klouček (CZE)	+ 5:11,4
19	Davide Malacarne (ITA)	+ 5:19,0
20	Thijs Van Amerongen (NED)	+ 5:25,0
21	Jempy Drucker (LUX)	+ 5:30,0
22	Romain Lejeune (FRA)	+ 5:40,3
23	Matthias Flückiger (SUI)	+ 5:52,3
24	René Lang (SUI)	+ 5:56,0
25	Dieter Vanthourenhout (BEL)	+ 6:12,8
26	Ondrej Bambula (CZE)	+ 6:16,0
27	David Menger (CZE)	+ 6:22,7
28	Patrick Van Leeuwen (NED)	+ 6:34,0
29	Marcel Wildhaber (SUI)	+ 6:45,9
30	Cristian Cominelli (ITA)	+ 7:02,6
31	Sascha Weber (GER)	+ 8:09,9
32	Florian Le Corre (FRA)	+ 8:16,7
33	Yannik-Johannes Tiedt (GER)	+ 8:31,7
34	Mauro Gonzalez Fontan (ESP)	+ 8:47,0
35	Marcin Sobiepanek (POL)	+ 8:55,5
36	James Driscoll (USA)	+ 9:09,0
37	Marco Ponta (ITA)	+ 9:18,5
38	Hugo Martinez Rus (ESP)	
39	Chance Noble (USA)	
40	Kim Michely (LUX)	
41	Dawid Romanowski (POL)	
42	Yu Takenouchi (JPN)	
43	Sylwester Janiszewski (POL)	
44	David Claerebout (LUX)	
45	Adam Bycka (POL)	
46	Daniel Neyens (USA)	
47	Charles Tobias Marzot (USA)	
48	Gabriele Mercante (ITA)	
49	Tomasz Repinski (POL)	
50	Kyle Douglas (CAN)	
51	Tetsuya Fujioka (JPN)	
52	Brian Zengeni (ZIM)	
53	Brian Robinson (CAN)	
54	Gorden Martin (ZIM)	
55	Aaron Schooler (CAN)	
56	Yudai Izawa (JPN)	
57	Shaun Adamson (CAN)	

A total of six riders abandoned the race: Yves Corminboeuf (Switzerland), David Lozano Riba (Spain), Byron Munyoro (Zimbabwe), Otsuka Wataru (Japan), Julien Taramarcaz (Switzerland) and Erlantz Uriarte Okamika (Spain).
