= 2008 UCI Cyclo-cross World Championships – Men's under-23 race =

Men's Under-23 Cyclo-cross Race
2008 UCI Cyclo-cross World Championships
- Rainbow jersey

Race details
- Dates: January 26, 2008
- Stages: 1
- Winning time: 51' 11"

Medalists
	Gold	Niels Albert (BEL)
	Silver	Aurelien Duval (FRA)
	Bronze	Cristian Cominelli (ITA)

This event was held on Saturday January 26, 2008 as part of the 2008 UCI Cyclo-cross World Championships in Treviso, Italy.

Niels Albert was the big favorite to win and on the first lap he drew away from the rest of the pack, where he remained, finishing more than half a minute in front of the number two. Duval pulled away from the pack, while Cominelli outsprinted Lopez to take the bronze.

== Ranking ==
Rank	Cyclist	Time
Gold medal	Niels Albert (BEL)	51:11.66
Silver medal	Aurelien Duval (FRA)	+ 0:38.90
Bronze medal	Cristian Cominelli (ITA)	+ 0:46.35
4	Jonathan Lopez (FRA)	+ 0:47.46
5	Clément Bourgoin (FRA)	+ 0:48.50
6	Lukas Kloucek (CZE)	+ 0:53.11
7	Fabio Ursi (ITA)	+ 1:05.21
8	Guillaume Perrot (FRA)	+ 1:31.29
9	Paul Voss (GER)	+ 1:39.10
10	Ramon Sinkeldam (NED)	+ 1:39.73
11	Thijs Van Amerongen (NED)	+ 1:39.80
12	Jempy Drucker (LUX)	+ 1:46.80
13	Julien Pion (FRA)	+ 1:52.36
14	Pawel Szczepaniak (POL)	+ 1:55.02
15	Ondrej Bambula (CZE)	+ 1:55.61
16	Philipp Walsleben (GER)	+ 1:57.69
17	René Lang (SUI)	+ 1:58.31
18	Tom Meeusen (BEL)	+ 1:58.36
19	Quentin Bertholet (BEL)	+ 2:01.35
20	Ian Field (GBR)	+ 2:19.21
21	Matteo Trentin (ITA)	+ 2:38.16
22	Mitchell Huenders (NED)	+ 2:42.53
23	Gorka Izagirre Insausti (ESP)	+ 2:45.23
24	Yannik-Johannes Tiedt (GER)	+ 2:46.34
25	Wim Leemans (BEL)	+ 2:53.56
26	Alessandro Calderan (ITA)	+ 2:58.44
27	Robert Gavenda (SVK)	+ 3:17.68
28	Julien Taramarcaz (SUI)	+ 3:18.75
29	Ivar Hartogs (NED)	+ 3:29.80
30	Marcel Meisen (GER)	+ 3:32.24
31	Sylwester Janiszewski (POL)	+ 3:39.14
32	David Lozano Riba (ESP)	+ 3:40.50
33	Marco Ponta (ITA)	+ 3:41.10
34	James Driscoll (USA)	+ 3:46.19
35	Joeri Adams (BEL)	+ 3:51.95
36	Yu Takenouchi (JPN)	+ 3:52.49
37	Mattias Nilsson (SWE)	+ 3:54.06
38	Ole Quast (GER)	+ 3:56.85
39	Jiri Polnicky (CZE)	+ 4:00.53
40	Boy Van Poppel (NED)	+ 4:05.53
41	Martin Haring (SVK)	+ 4:07.24
42	Brian Robinson (CAN)	+ 4:18.08
43	Nicholas Weighall (USA)	+ 4:35.70
44	Chance Noble (USA)	+ 4:55.17
45	Carson Miller (USA)	+ 5:44.68
46	Nico Brüngger (SUI)	+ 5:57.03
47	David Menger (CZE)	+ 6:06.81
48	Mark Thwaites (GBR)	+ 6:18.01
49	Mauro Gonzalez Fontan (ESP)	+ 7:15.09
50	Kyle Douglas (CAN)	+ 7:27.55
51	Guillaume Dessibourg (SUI)	+ 8:01.54
52	Tomasz Repinski (POL)	1 LAP
53	Yudai Izawa (JPN)	1 LAP
54	Shaun Adamson (CAN)	1 LAP
55	Lucian Logigan (ROU)	1 LAP
56	Yegor Dementyev (UKR)	1 LAP

== Fastest laps ==
Lap	Cyclist	Time
1.	(Belgium) Niels Albert	6:54
2.	(France) Aurelien Duval	7:11
3.	(Italy) Cristian Cominelli	7:16
4.	(Italy) Cristian Cominelli	7:16
5.	(Italy) Cristian Cominelli	7:17
6.	(Germany) Philipp Walsleben	7:21
7.	(France) Aurelien Duval	7:10
