= 2007 UCI Cyclo-cross World Championships – Men's junior race =

Men's Junior Cyclo-cross Race
2007 UCI Cyclo-cross World Championships
- Rainbow jersey

Race details
- Dates: January 27, 2007
- Stages: 1
- Winning time: 41' 18"

Medalists
	Gold	Joeri Adams (BEL)
	Silver	Daniel Summerhill (USA)
	Bronze	Jiri Polnicky (CZE)

The 2007 UCI Cyclo-cross World Championships – Men's junior race was held on Saturday 27 January 2007 as a part of the 2007 UCI Cyclo-cross World Championships in Hooglede-Gits, Belgium.

== Ranking ==
Rank	Cyclist	Time
1st place, gold medalist(s)	Joeri Adams (BEL)	41:18.0
2nd place, silver medalist(s)	Daniel Summerhill (USA)	+ 0:00.7
3rd place, bronze medalist(s)	Jiri Polnicky (CZE)	+ 0:01.3
4	Ramon Sinkeldam (NED)	+ 0:02.4
5	Ole Quast (GER)	+ 0:11.2
6	Arnaud Jouffroy (FRA)	+ 0:32.5
7	Alessandro Calderan (ITA)	+ 0:44.5
8	Rob Van Der Velde (NED)	+ 0:58.3
9	Marek Konwa (POL)	+ 1:06.3
10	Peter Sagan (SVK)	+ 1:10.7
11	Elia Silvestri (ITA)	+ 1:11.8
12	Kevin Eeckhout (BEL)	+ 1:16.9
13	Jonathan Mcevoy (GBR)	+ 1:28.2
14	Marcel Meisen (GER)	+ 1:35.5
15	Matthieu Boulo (FRA)	+ 1:42.1
16	Filip Adel (CZE)	+ 1:45.1
17	Vincent Baestaens (BEL)	+ 1:56.4
18	Stef Boden (BEL)	+ 2:04.7
19	Lubomir Petrus (CZE)	+ 2:19.9
20	Thomas Girard (FRA)	+ 2:27.7
21	Twan Van Den Brand (NED)	+ 2:31.5
22	Petr Marvan (CZE)	+ 2:35.8
23	Fabian Danner (GER)	+ 2:38.8
24	Matthias Rupp (SUI)	+ 2:47.2
25	Jim Aernouts (BEL)	+ 2:54.8
26	Thomas Lemaitre (FRA)	+ 2:56.5
27	Marian Simora (SVK)	+ 3:00.5
28	David Fletcher (GBR)	+ 3:10.7
29	Kevin Leveghi (ITA)	+ 3:23.6
30	Nick Keough (USA)	+ 3:25.6
31	Garikoitz Bravo Oiarbide (ESP)	+ 3:28.6
32	Scott Thwaites (GBR)	+ 3:30.3
33	Carson Miller (USA)	+ 3:36.3
34	Valentin Scherz (SUI)	+ 3:47.5
35	Jordy Beuker (NED)	+ 3:52.2
36	Thibault Taboury (FRA)	+ 4:01.6
37	Arnaud Grand (SUI)	+ 4:09.0
38	Josef Rauber (GER)	+ 4:19.3
39	Vincent Dias Dos Santos (LUX)	+ 4:39.4
40	Victor Cabedo (ESP)	+ 4:50.9
41	Giuseppe Michieletto (ITA)	+ 4:51.2
42	Alex Paton (GBR)	+ 4:51.3
43	Max Walsleben (GER)	+ 5:08.2
44	Jerome Townsend (USA)	+ 5:08.7
45	Kacper Szczepaniak (POL)	+ 5:08.9
46	Kamil Markowski (POL)	+ 5:09.4
47	Peter Frei (SUI)	+ 5:11.8
48	Miroslaw Frackowiak (POL)	+ 5:36.6
49	Sean Worsech (USA)	+ 5:48.7
50	Pierre Kaeslin (SUI)	+ 5:51.9
51	Pit Schlechter (LUX)	+ 5:55.9
52	Spencer Smitheman (CAN)	+ 5:56.9
53	Geert Van Der Horst (NED)	+ 6:24.6
54	Jon Ander Manjon Alvarez (ESP)	+ 7:56.7
55	Piotr Antkowiak (POL)	+ 8:42.3
56	Morten Gregersen (DEN)	+ 9:02.2
57	Marek Benda (CZE)	

Two riders, Mattias Nilsson from Sweden and Eduardo Recasens Gasso from Spain, were disqualified for riding through the pits without changing bikes.
