= Bartkevičius =

Bartkevičius is a Lithuanian-language surname. Polish counterpart: Bartkiewicz, Russian/Belarusian: Bartkevich. The surname is derived from Bartek, a diminutive for Bartholomeus.

- Ričardas Bartkevičius, Lithuanian painter and educator
- Antanas Bartkevičius, Lithuanian astronomer, namesake of asteroid 141496 Bartkevicius
- Juozas Bartkevičius, a Lithuanian Righteous Among the Nations
