= 2010 UCI Cyclo-cross World Championships – Men's junior race =

Men's Junior Cyclo-cross Race
2010 UCI Cyclo-cross World Championships
- Rainbow jersey

Race details
- Dates: January 30, 2010
- Stages: 1
- Distance: 15.66 km (9.73 mi)
- Winning time: 40' 30"

Medalists
| | Gold | Tomas Paprstka (CZE) |
| | Silver | Julian Alaphilippe (FRA) |
| | Bronze | Emiel Dolfsma (NED) |

This event was held on Saturday 30 January 2010 as part of the 2010 UCI Cyclo-cross World Championships in Tábor, Czech Republic. The length of the course was 15.66 km (0.16 km + 5 laps of 3.10 km each).

== Ranking ==
| Rank | Cyclist | Time |
|---|---|---|
| Gold medal | Tomas Paprstka (CZE) | 40:30 |
| Silver medal | Julian Alaphilippe (FRA) | + 0:00 |
| Bronze medal | Emiel Dolfsma (NED) | + 0:09 |
| 4 | Matej Lasak (CZE) | + 0:19 |
| 5 | Gianni Vermeersch (BEL) | + 0:20 |
| 6 | Gert-Jan Bosman (NED) | + 0:39 |
| 7 | David Menut (FRA) | + 0:48 |
| 8 | David Van Der Poel (NED) | + 0:48 |
| 9 | Laurens Sweeck (BEL) | + 0:56 |
| 10 | Michiel van der Heijden (NED) | + 1:00 |
| 11 | Radek Polnicky (CZE) | + 1:01 |
| 12 | Tim Merlier (BEL) | + 1:09 |
| 13 | Clément Lebras (FRA) | + 1:09 |
| 14 | Yannick Eckmann (GER) | + 1:11 |
| 15 | Clément Venturini (FRA) | + 1:14 |
| 16 | Michael Boros (CZE) | + 1:31 |
| 17 | Bob Jungels (LUX) | + 1:32 |
| 18 | Vojtech Nipl (CZE) | + 1:40 |
| 19 | Emilien Viennet (FRA) | + 1:49 |
| 20 | Diether Sweeck (BEL) | + 1:53 |
| 21 | Lars Forster (SUI) | + 1:54 |
| 22 | Jannick Geisler (GER) | + 2:00 |
| 23 | Janusz Lessnau (POL) | + 2:00 |
| 24 | Danny van Poppel (NED) | + 2:14 |
| 25 | Fabio Alfonso Todaro (ITA) | + 2:14 |
| 26 | Lukas Müller (SUI) | + 2:27 |
| 27 | Eduard Michael Grosu (ROU) | + 2:28 |
| 28 | Wenzel Böhm-Gräber (GER) | + 2:32 |
| 29 | Jens Vandekinderen (BEL) | + 2:32 |
| 30 | Julian Lehmann (GER) | + 2:42 |
| 31 | Jon Ander Insausti Irastorza (ESP) | + 2:50 |
| 32 | Francesco Acqvaviva (ITA) | + 2:56 |
| 33 | Cody Kaiser (USA) | + 3:05 |
| 34 | Bartosz Pilis (POL) | + 3:06 |
| 35 | Nicolas Samparisi (ITA) | + 3:17 |
| 36 | Thomas Moses (GBR) | + 3:24 |
| 37 | Luke Gray (GBR) | + 3:28 |
| 38 | Pablo Rodriguez Guede (ESP) | + 3:43 |
| 39 | Chris Wallace (USA) | + 4:08 |
| 40 | Kris Dahl (CAN) | + 4:11 |
| 41 | Paulo Gonzalez Fontan (ESP) | + 4:14 |
| 42 | Scott Thiltges (LUX) | + 4:16 |
| 43 | Fabian Lienhard (SUI) | + 4:20 |
| 44 | Jeffrey Bahnson (USA) | + 4:21 |
| 45 | Mackenzie Carson (CAN) | + 4:21 |
| 46 | Pietro Santini (ITA) | + 4:27 |
| 47 | Jaroslav Chalas (SVK) | + 4:47 |
| 48 | Rudy Lorenzon (ITA) | + 5:18 |
| 49 | Lex Reichling (LUX) | + 5:31 |
| 50 | Luke Grivell-Mellor (GBR) | + 5:55 |
| 51 | Peio Goikoetxea (ESP) | + 6:18 |
| 52 | Kiernan Orange (CAN) | + 6:24 |
| 53 | Skyler Trujillo (USA) | + 6:27 |
| 54 | George Stancu (ROU) | + 6:53 |
| 55 | Tom Schwarmes (LUX) | + 7:17 |
| 56 | Marek Michalec (SVK) | + 7:38 |
| 57 | Matt Spinks (USA) | + 7:48 |
| 58 | Conor O'Brien (CAN) | + 8:22 |
| 59 | Lukas Gebrlin (SVK) | + 8:34 |
| 60 | Daniel Hula (SVK) | Lapped |
| 61 | Jonas Pedersen (DEN) | Lapped |
