= Snake Alley Criterium =

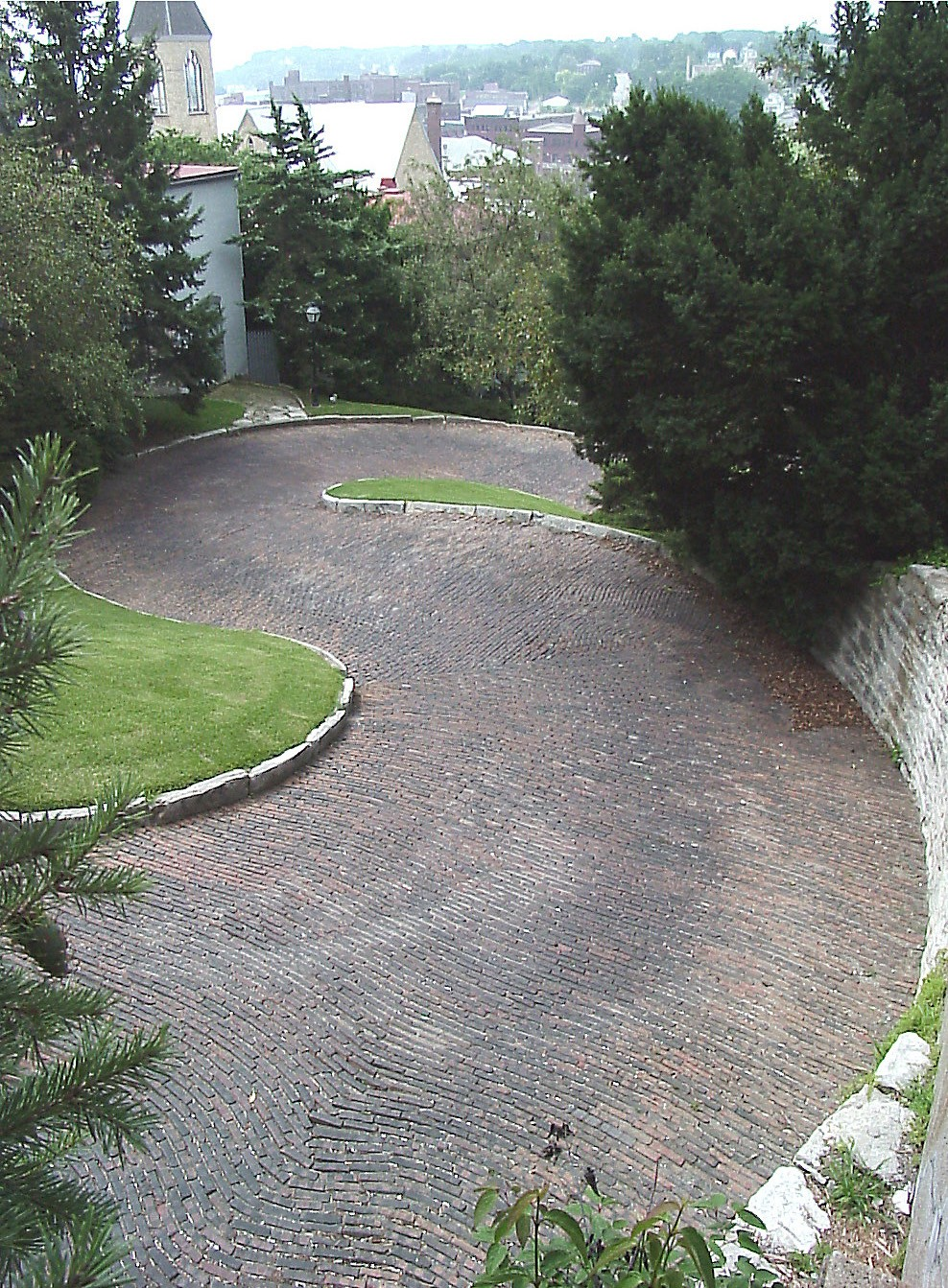
- Snake Alley

Race details
- Date: May
- Region: Burlington, Iowa
- Discipline: Road
- Competition: National calendar
- Type: Criterium
- Organiser: Bike Burlington
- Race director: Newt Colburn
- Web site: snakealleycriterium.com

History
- First edition: 1983
- Editions: 40 (as of 2024)
- First winner: Jeff Bradley (USA)
- Most wins: Jason McCartney (USA) (3 wins)
- Most recent: Cade Bickmore (USA)

History (women)
- First winner: Liz Heller (USA)
- Most wins: Magen Long (USA); Amanda Miller (USA); (3 wins)
- Most recent: Rylee Mcmullen (USA)

The Snake Alley Criterium is a criterium cycling race that takes place annually on Memorial Day weekend in Burlington, Iowa. The bike race is most famous for riding up Snake Alley, which was named by Ripley's Believe It Or Not as the crookedest alley in the world. The Snake Alley portion of the race includes a 60-foot (18 m) ascent on the 276-foot-long (84 m) alley and includes five major turns.

This race has been said to be one of the most challenging bicycle races in the Midwest. A national cycling magazine has named the Snake Alley Criterium to be the fifth best criterium in the nation. The race spans over two days, and many of the downtown streets are closed to traffic. The course spans over 15 city blocks. Throughout the course the elevation ranges between 555 feet (169 m) and 678 feet (207 m).

Competitors may include anyone from the age of ten to senior citizens. These age groups however, do not all race in the same event. The Criterium is open to men and women both of which compete in separate races. Prizes vary between $50 for Juniors to $10,000 for the Pro's. Each race has a maximum number of competitors; the smallest group being 50, the largest being 150. The Junior group rides the fewest laps (four), and the Pro group rides the most laps which is a total of twenty-five. The entry fees are different for each group. The Juniors pay the least amount of money, fifteen dollars, and the Pros pay the most with forty-five. As with any credible bike race, proper safety equipment must be worn at all times.

== Winners ==
=== Men ===
Year	Winner	Second	Third
1983	(United States) Jeff Bradley		
1984	(Canada) Eon D'Ornellas		
1985	(United States) Mike King		
1986	Robert Mathias		
1987	Robert Mionsk		
1988	Hajo Drees		
1989	Hajo Drees		
1990	(United States) Chris Washkevich		
1991	(United States) Troy Miller		
1992	(United States) Tommy Matush		
1993	(United States) John Peters		
1994	(United States) Timm Peddie		
1995	(United States) John Durso		
1996	(United States) Steve Tilford		
1997	(United States) Todd Littlehales		
1998	(United States) Matthew Kelly		
1999	Marc Kebbekus		
2000	(United States) Steven Cate		
2001	(United States) Jason McCartney	(United States) John Lieswyn	(United States) Steve Tilford
2002	(United States) John Lieswyn	(United States) Steven Cate	(United States) Doug Swanson
2003	(United States) Jason McCartney	(United States) John Lieswyn	(United States) Steven Cate
2004	(United States) Jason McCartney	(United States) Adam Bergman	(United States) Garrett Peltonen
2005	(United States) Steve Tilford	(United States) Brian Jensen	(United States) Ben Raby
2006	(Australia) Sean Sullivan	(United States) Chris Wherry	(United States) Reid Mumford
2007	(United States) Adam Bergman	(United States) Brian Jensen	(United States) Brian Dziewa
2008	(United States) Duane Dickey	(United States) Brian Jensen	(United States) Bryce Mead
2009	(United States) Adam Bergman	(United States) Paul Martin	(United States) Frank Dierking
2010	(Ukraine) Volodymyr Starchyk	(United States) Tristan Schouten	(United States) Eric Marcotte
2011	(United States) Chad Burdzilauskas	(United States) Eric Marcotte	(Argentina) Juan Pablo Dotti
2012	(United States) Paul Martin	(Canada) Ryan Aitcheson	(United States) Alex Vanias
2013	(United States) Adam Leibovitz	(United States) Colton Barrett	(United States) Daniel Holt
2014	(United States) Daniel Holloway	(Latvia) Toms Skujinš	(New Zealand) Alexander Ray
2015	(United States) Chris Uberti	(Australia) Chris Winn	(United States) Logan Owen
2016	(United States) Matthew Zimmer	(Australia) Chris Winn	(United States) Joshua Johnson
2017	(Canada) Ryan Aitcheson	(United States) Thomas Brown	(United States) Peter Olejniczak
2018	(United States) Daniel Summerhill	(United States) Sam Fritz	(United States) Peter Olejniczak
2019	(United States) Daniel Summerhill	(United States) Kyle Perry	(United States) Samuel Janisch
2020-2021	Cancelled		
2022	(United States) Andrew Dillman	(United States) Cade Bickmore	(Bermuda) Conor White

=== Élites Femmes ===
Year	Winner	Second	Third
1988	(United States) Liz Heller		
1989	Sonja Stilp		
1990	(United States) Liz Heller		
1991	(United States) Tracey Lamers		
1992	Sue Swenson		
1993	(United States) Deirdre Demet		
1994	(United States) Karen Dunne		
1995	(United States) Elaine Nekritz		
1996	(United States) Cynthia Mommsen		
1997	(United States) Bonnie Breeze		
1998	Debre Pilger		
1999	(United States) Andrea Bowman		
2000	(United States) Cynthia Mommsen		
2001	(United States) Catherine Walberg	Christine Miller	(United States) Cynthia Mommsen
2002	(United States) Magen Long	(United States) Kerry Soraci	Christine Miller
2003	(United States) Magen Long	(New Zealand) Tania Duff-Miller	(New Zealand) Jo Kiesanowski
2004	(United States) Magen Long	(United States) Rebecca Much	(United States) Elizabeth Morse
2005	(United States) Sarah Tillotson		
2006	(United States) Kristin Wentworth	Molly Vetter-Smith	(United States) Katie Weber
2007	(United States) Kristin Wentworth	(United States) Mindi Martin	(United States) Anne Grabowski
2008	(United States) Samantha Schneider		
2009	(United States) Amanda Miller		
2010	(United States) Amanda Miller	(United States) Lisa Vetterlein	(United States) Ashley James
2011	(United States) Amanda Miller		
2012	(United States) Kaitlin Antonneau	(New Zealand) Jeannie Kuhajek	(United States) Emma Bast
2013	(United States) Kim Eppen	(United States) Mia Manganello	(United States) Katherine Shields
2014	(United States) Lisa Vetterlein	(United States) Abby Ruess	(United States) Amber Markey
2015	(United States) Chloé Dygert	(United States) Mary Penta	(United States) Gwen Inglis
2016	(United States) Abby Ruess	(United States) Gwen Inglis	(United States) Leah Kleager
2017	(United States) Lily Williams	(New Zealand) Jeannie Kuhajek	(United States) Amanda Miller
2018	(United States) Faith Montreuil	(United States) Carlyn Jackson	(United States) Cassidy Hickey
2019	(United States) Gwen Inglis	(United States) Carlyn Jackson	(United States) Kaitlyn Agnew
2020-2021	Cancelled		
2022	(United States) Maddy Ward	(Australia) Peta Mullens	(United States) Rylee McMullen
