= Bartkiewicz =

Bartkiewicz is a Polish surname. Notable people with this surname include:

- Andrzej Bartkiewicz (born 1991), Polish cyclist
- Drew Bartkiewicz, American business executive
