= 2010 UCI Cyclo-cross World Championships – Women's elite race =

Women's Elite Cyclo-cross Race
2010 UCI Cyclo-cross World Championships
- Rainbow jersey

Race details
- Dates: January 31, 2010
- Stages: 1
- Distance: 15.66 km (9.73 mi)
- Winning time: 42' 59"

Medalists
	Gold	Marianne Vos (NED)
	Silver	Hanka Kupfernagel (GER)
	Bronze	Daphny Van Den Brand (NED)

This event was held on Sunday 31 January 2010 as part of the 2010 UCI Cyclo-cross World Championships in Tábor, Czech Republic. The length of the course was 15.66 km (0.16 km + 5 laps of 3.10 km each).

== Ranking ==
Rank	Cyclist	Time
Gold medal	Marianne Vos (NED)	42:59
Silver medal	Hanka Kupfernagel (GER)	+ 0:45
Bronze medal	Daphny Van Den Brand (NED)	+ 1:02
4	Kateřina Nash (CZE)	+ 1:20
5	Eva Lechner (ITA)	+ 1:41
6	Christel Ferrier-Bruneau (FRA)	+ 1:47
7	Caroline Mani (FRA)	+ 1:53
8	Pauline Ferrand-Prévot (FRA)	+ 2:11
9	Sanne Van Paassen (NED)	+ 2:28
10	Lucie Chainel-Lefevre (FRA)	+ 2:31
11	Annie Last (GBR)	+ 2:37
12	Meredith Miller (USA)	+ 2:55
13	Sabrina Schweizer (GER)	+ 3:00
14	Amy Dombroski (USA)	+ 3:16
15	Sanne Cant (BEL)	+ 3:18
16	Linda Van Rijen (NED)	+ 3:23
17	Rocio Gamonal Ferrera (ESP)	+ 3:30
18	Maureen Demaret Guichardot (FRA)	+ 3:39
19	Nikki Harris (GBR)	+ 3:49
20	Elisabeth Brandau (GER)	+ 4:02
21	Martina Zwick (GER)	+ 4:04
22	Katrin Leumann (SUI)	+ 4:09
23	Helen Wyman (GBR)	+ 4:09
24	Joyce Vanderbeken (BEL)	+ 4:27
25	Maureen Bruno Roy (USA)	+ 4:28
26	Arenda Grimberg (NED)	+ 4:37
27	Gabriella Day (GBR)	+ 4:51
28	Jana Kyptova (CZE)	+ 5:00
29	Sophie De Boer (NED)	+ 5:00
30	Pavla Havliková (CZE)	+ 5:25
31	Laura Van Gilder (USA)	+ 5:53
32	Reza Hormes (NED)	+ 6:10
33	Martina Mikulaskova (CZE)	+ 6:14
34	Zuzana Pirzkallova (CZE)	+ 6:15
35	Masami Morita (JPN)	+ 6:36
36	Nikoline Hansen (DEN)	+ 7:06
37	Marzena Wasiuk (POL)	+ 7:16
38	Ayako Toyooka (JPN)	+ 7:28
39	Chika Fukumoto (JPN)	+ 8:57
40	Michiko Shimura (JPN)	+ 9:48
41	Vicki Thomas (CAN)	+ 10:31
42	Eszter Dosa (HUN)	Lapped
43	Zuzana Vojtasova (SVK)	Lapped
