= 2010 UCI Cyclo-cross World Championships =

Cyclo-cross championship

- Venue: Tábor, Czech Republic
- Date: 30–31 January 2010
- Coordinates: 49°24′52″N 14°39′28″E
- Events: 4

The 2010 UCI Cyclo-cross World Championships took place in Tábor, Czech Republic on the weekend of January 30 and 31, 2010. As in 2009, four events were scheduled.

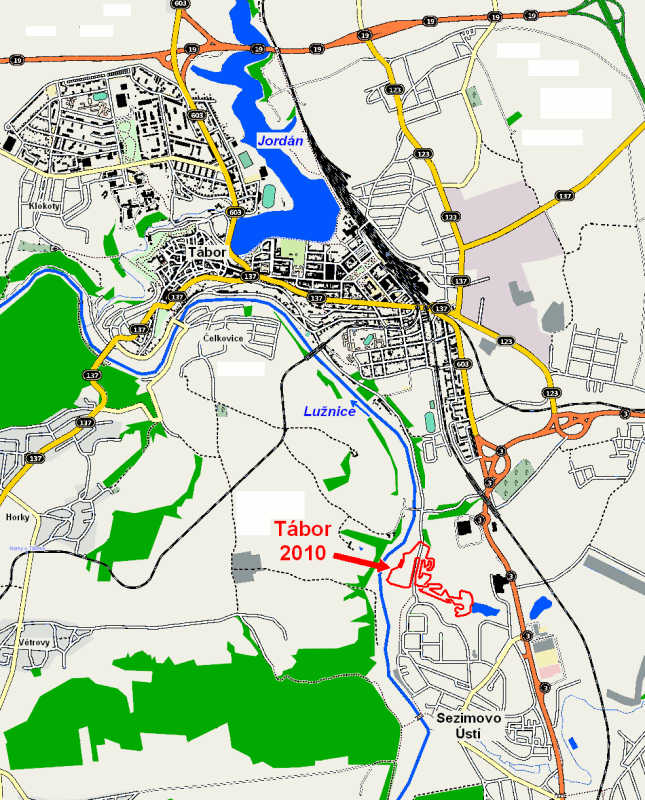
Course of the 2010 Cyclo-cross World Championships in Tábor

== Schedule ==
- Saturday, 30 January 2010:
  - 11h00 Men's Junior
  - 14h00 Men's Under-23
- Sunday, 31 January 2010:
  - 11h00 Women's Elite
  - 14h00 Men's Elite

== Medal table ==
| Rank | Nation | Gold | Silver | Bronze | Total |
|---|---|---|---|---|---|
| 1 | Czech Republic (CZE) | 2 | 0 | 0 | 2 |
| 2 | France (FRA) | 1 | 1 | 0 | 2 |
| 3 | Netherlands (NED) | 1 | 0 | 2 | 3 |
| 4 | Belgium (BEL) | 0 | 2 | 1 | 3 |
| 5 | Germany (GER) | 0 | 1 | 0 | 1 |
| 6 | Poland (POL) | 0 | 0 | 1 | 1 |
| Totals (6 entries) | | 4 | 4 | 4 | 12 |

== Medal summary ==
| Event | Gold | | Silver | | Bronze | |
|---|---|---|---|---|---|---|
Men's events
| Men's elite race | Zdeněk Štybar; Czech Republic | 1h 08'58" | Klaas Vantornout; Belgium | + 21" | Sven Nys; Belgium | + 38" |
| Men's under-23 race | Arnaud Jouffroy; France | 55' 58" | Tom Meeusen; Belgium | + 25" | Marek Konwa; Poland | + 35" |
| Men's junior race | Tomáš Paprstka; Czech Republic | 40'30" | Julian Alaphilippe; France | s.t. | Emiel Dolfsma; Netherlands | + 9" |
Women's events
| Women's elite race | Marianne Vos; Netherlands | 42'59" | Hanka Kupfernagel; Germany | + 45" | Daphny Van Den Brand; Netherlands | + 1'02" |
