= 2007 UCI Cyclo-cross World Championships =

Cyclo-cross championship

- Venue: Hooglede-Gits, Belgium
- Date: January 27–28, 2007
- Coordinates: 50°59′N 03°05′E
- Events: 4

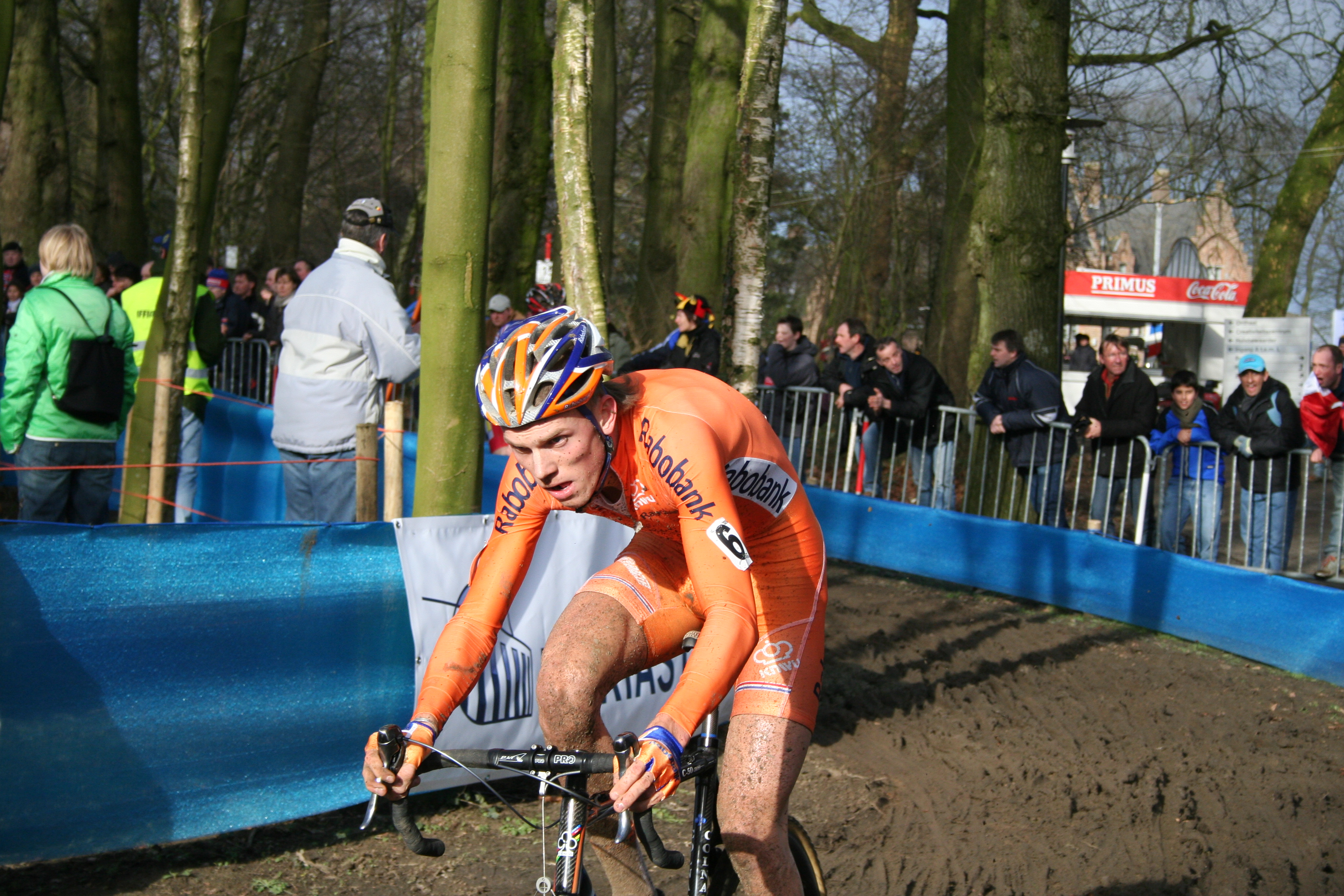
Lars Boom wins the U23s race

The 2007 UCI Cyclo-cross World Championships were held from 27 to 28 January 2007 at the Domenico Savio Park in Hooglede-Gits, Belgium.

== Medal summary ==
Event	Gold		Silver		Bronze	
Men's events
Men's elite race	Erwin Vervecken; Belgium	1h 05'35"	Jonathan Page; United States	+ 3"	Enrico Franzoi; Italy	+ 16"
Men's under-23 race	Lars Boom; Netherlands	53'53"	Niels Albert; Belgium	+ 1'22"	Romain Villa; France	+ 1'44"
Men's junior race	Joeri Adams; Belgium	41'18"	Danny Summerhill; United States	s.t.	Jiri Polnicky; Czech Republic	+ 1"
Women's events
Women's elite race	Maryline Salvetat; France	42'57"	Katie Compton; United States	+ 1"	Laurence Leboucher; France	+ 9"

== Medal table ==
Rank	Nation	Gold	Silver	Bronze	Total
1	Belgium (BEL)	2	1	0	3
2	France (FRA)	1	0	2	3
3	Netherlands (NED)	1	0	0	1
4	United States (USA)	0	3	0	3
5	Czech Republic (CZE)	0	0	1	1
5	Italy (ITA)	0	0	1	1
Totals (6 entries)		4	4	4	12
