= Lettrs =

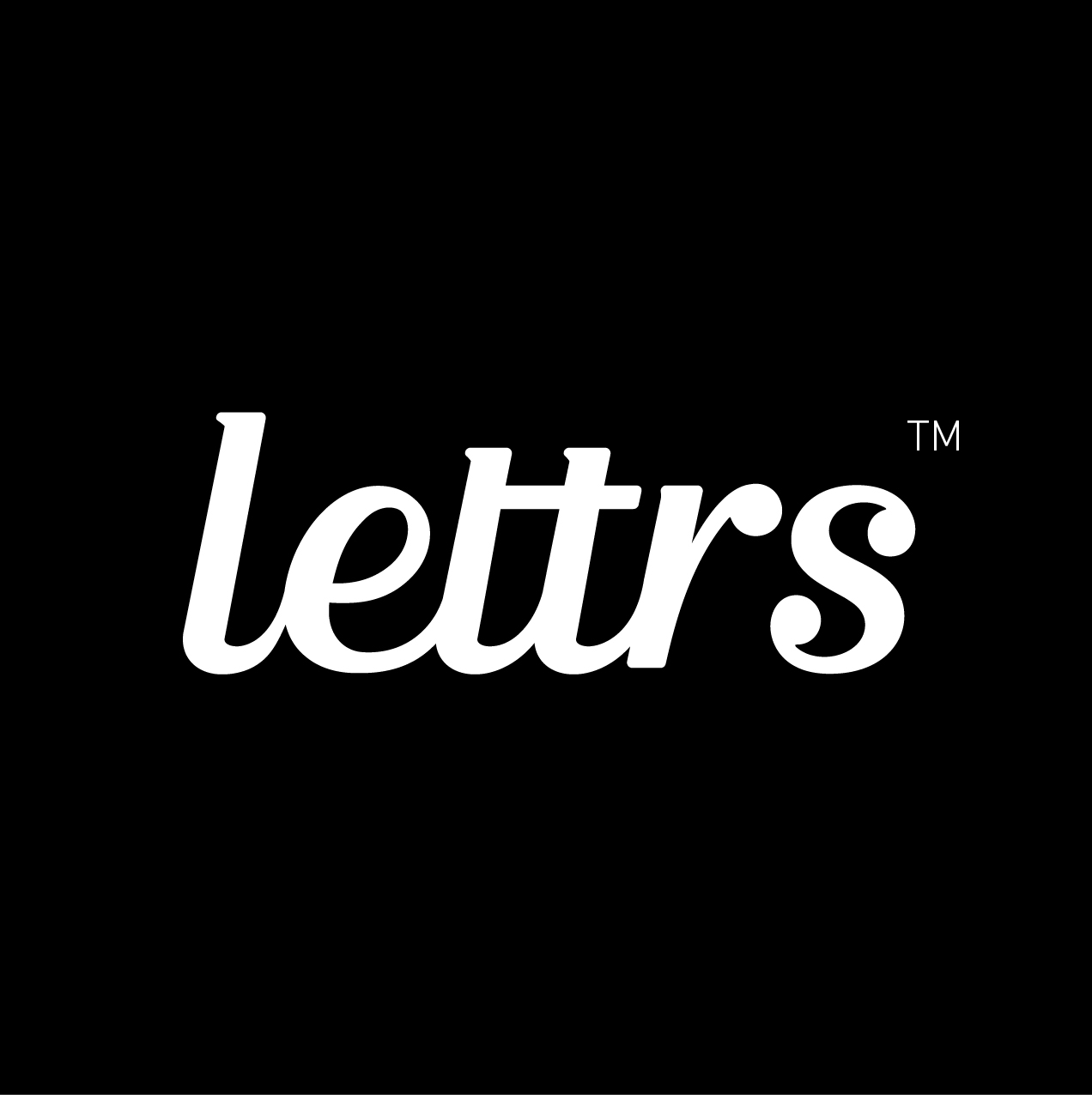
- Developer: Drew Bartkiewicz (CEO)
- Release: 2012
- Operating system: iOS, Android
- Type: Social networking
- Website: www.lettrs.com

Lettrs (stylized in all lowercase) was a mobile application and social network that allowed users to compose and send mobile messages privately or publicly.

Lettrs is headquartered in New York City and Drew Bartkiewicz is the company’s CEO and co-founder. In 2015, Mark Jung was named the company chairman. Lettrs had a userbase in 174 countries, over 1 million downloads and was featured in several media outlers, including The Wall Street Journal, CBS and NPR.

== History ==
lettrs was established in 2012 by technology entrepreneur Drew Bartkiewicz. Bartkiewicz came up with the idea for the company in 2008 after being inspired by his grandmother’s letter writing and his own experiences during his service in the military. lettrs was officially established the summer of 2012 with the help of his wife, Araceli Bartkiewicz, and children, though it was not launched as a global platform from its beta phase until December 2012.

Bartkiewicz introduced the lettrs mobile application at the PostalVision 2020/3.0 conference in Washington, D.C. in 2013. The Android version was released in July 2014, followed by a re-release of the iOS app in October.

== Features ==
lettrs provides a mobile platform for customers to create and deliver mobile letters in 80 translated languages with a selection of writing themes, proprietary “SocialStamps” and styles. It facilitates both private messaging and public posting of signed, translated and networked mobile-to-mobile letters.

The signature service of lettrs is the translation of letter messages in real time complete with original user signatures and selectable SocialStamps. The lettrs mobile network is able to translate an original digital letter in up to 80 languages. Users may also share open letters and the lettrs stamps across other major social networks.

In December 2014 the company introduced a feature named SocialStamps that allows users to add a customized stamp to a letter. At the feature’s launch, the company offered 47 different stamps with plans to issue new stamps monthly. As part of the release the lettrs 2014 Persons of Note stamps on the lettrs network featured Michelle Phan, Narendra Modi, Bob Woodruff of ABC News and Stanley A. McChrystal.

Users can share letters and the SocialStamps via Facebook and Twitter. lettrs also integrates with Google+ and Instagram so that users may broaden the distribution of their letters beyond the mobile app. Users can also pen open public letters or petitions for supporting causes, persons, or brands.

lettrs conducted its first Hollywood movie integration in April 2015 with Relativity Media. The company released stamps featuring images from the movie Desert Dancer. In May 2015, lettrs released the "Women of Note" stamp collection. It featured 12 notable women including Michelle Obama, Queen Rania of Jordan, Shakira, Michelle Bachelet, Laura Bush, Sonia Gandhi, Ellen DeGeneres and Angelina Jolie.

== Recognition and partnerships ==
In 2014, Google selected lettrs as one of the Best Android Apps of the year.

Lettrs has worked with the USO, Aspen Institute, and the United Way. In 2014, the company published the first digitally sourced book of letters, Poetguese. The book contains a foreword by author Paulo Coelho with all proceeds donated to charity.

Lettrs established lettrs Foundation, an organization that partners with schools and non-profits to improve literacy through social networking, including partnerships with the United Way and Aspen Institute.
