= Adam Bergman =

American cyclist

Adam Bergman (born August 30, 1980) is an American cyclist.

== Career ==
Adam Bergman began his cycling career on a mountain bike at the age of 15 and made the transition to road racing the next year. His talents became noticed in 2003, when he took over the leader's jersey during the Nature Valley Grand Prix in front of his hometown crowd, in Minneapolis.

In July 2004, Bergman faced a two-year suspension from USADA for the use of EPO. While Bergman initially denied the accusation, he eventually admitted using the drug in February 2006.
