= Ričardas Bartkevičius =

Lithuanian painter and educator (born 1959)

Ričardas Bartkevičius (born 21 February 1959 in Vilnius) is a prominent Lithuanian painter and educator.

== Biography ==
Bartkevičius demonstrated artistic talent in his early childhood. His art studies began in Vilnius (the School of J. Vienožinskis). The first personal exhibition was held in 1979. In 1986 he graduated from the Painting Department of Vilnius Academy of Arts. During the years of the studies he got to know and he was acquainted with such leading figures of Lithuanian art as Sofija Veiverytė, Algimantas Švėgžda, Antanas Gudaitis, Augustinas Savickas, Jonas Čeponis. Looking for his own painting style he admired and drew under the inspiration of El Greco, Tintoretto, and Peter Breigel works. Later he was interested in German, French, Lithuanian representatives of Expressionism. In 1982, 1984 he visited Armenia and Georgia. The medieval coloring of these countries paintings, the primitive art traditions have found resonance in the further works. Since 1990 he became a member of the Lithuanian Artists' Association, in 1994 he initiated an artists' group "E" creation, also he became a member of the group "Individualists" (1996). In 1999 he was awarded by the annual prize from Lithuanian Artists' Association and he got the State Grant of the Highest Degree. In 2004 he again earned the State Grant of the Highest Degree. From 1990 he teaches at Vilnius Pedagogical University (Professor), he was a Head of the Department of Fine Arts for a long time. He is actively involved in Lithuanian cultural life, he had many solo exhibitions. His works are welcomed not only in the European continent, but also in Asia, American art lovers. The fact that this particular artist is admired by foreign evaluators paintings are well reflected by the fact that in 2008 he was invited to participate in the international project "Art Meeting East Europe", yet such call received only two Lithuanians - Stasys Eidrigevičius and R. Bartkevičius.

== Reception ==
According to the famous Polish art critic Krzysztof Stanislawski: "R. Bartkevičius with the aid of the colors and forms, which often just run over the frames, is telling different stories, he is not afraid to use the traditional motives, he creates landscapes, often depicts flowers in pots, animals, also he paints portraits. The painter is managing the bright, pure colors, the spontaneous expressive stroke of the brush. He is not only an expressionist in the soul (colors), but also physically by the whole body and the painting style."

As remarked the leading Lithuanian art critic Alfonsas Andriuškevičius: "R. Bartkevičius is painting not only by the hand, but one hundred percent by the movement. His works are pulsing of vital and dynamic sense of life."

Joan Vastokas, an art historian, writes that Bartkevičius "…on the other hand although verging on the abstract are in fact figurative and expressionist in style, closely akin to and likely influenced by DeKooning or recent trends in postmodern German painting. An abstract expressionist, his works feature a lot of action, broad gestures and brushstrokes and color. He juxtaposes tradition and modernity. His paintings often appear too abstract, but on closer observation, figures subtly emerge. His works are full of drama and have a strong affinity with those of Francis Bacon and Willem de Kooning. The most interesting aspect of Bartkevičius’ work is his mixture of religious and erotic themes. More playful, and therefore closer to Western versions of Postmodernism."

== Works ==
Works in the Collections: The Collection of Speyer Municipality (Germany), Zimmerli Art Museum (USA), The Collection of Tore Canavese Municipality (Italy), Lithuanian Art Museum, The Collection of Vilnius’ Municipality (Lithuania). Works in the Private Collections: Russia, Germany, France, Israel, Canada, USA, Denmark, Norway, Japan, the Netherlands, Poland, Italy, Lithuania.

== Selected solo exhibitions ==
- 2013 Personal Exhibition of R. Bartkevičiaus' Paintings, dedicated for Lithuanian Presidency of the EU Council (2013 10 02 – 10 31), Ministry of Foreign Affairs of the Republic of Lithuania, Vilnius.
- 2012 „R. Bartkevičius: Painting“ (2012 05 07 – 2012 05 13) Dumlupinar University Gallery, Kutahya, Turkey.

“Simple as 2x2”, (2012 12 06 – 2013 01 02), Lithuanian Artists‘ Union Gallery, Vilnius;

„About Women by Flowers”, (2012 03 08 – 05 08), B. Grincevičiūtė House-Museum, Vilnius;

- 2009 „R.B. ART 1986-2009”, (2009 01 27 – 02 18), Gallery “Arka”, Vilnius;
- 2008 „Painting”, (2008 02 22 – 04 20), Lithuanian National Philharmonic, Vilnius;

„The Admirable Daily Round”, (2008 03 08 – 06 08), Palanga; „Painting” (2008 05 03 – 06 30) project „East Europe Art Meetings“, Galeria Sztuki Współczesnej WIGRY, Dom Pracy Tworczej, Wigry, Poland.

- 2006 „The Sound and the Color”, (2006 10 28.), Lithuanian technical library, Vilnius;

„Ričardas Bartkevičius Painting”, (2006 03 15 – 05 15), „Kolonada”, Druskininkai;

- 2004 „Pa-Ri-Pa-Ri”, (2004 01 13 – 02 11), Gallery „Maldis”, Vilnius;

„Personal Exhibition of Paintings”, (2003 12 19 – 2004 02 19), VPU Gallery „2003”, Vilnius;

- 2003 „Ričardas Bartkevičius, painting, Leif Sylvester, sculpture”, Galleri Python, Copenhagen;

„Ričardas Bartkevičius – exhibition of painting”, (2003 10 22 – 11 11), Lyngby Kulturhus, Copenhagen;

- 2001 „Painting”, Klaipėda Exhibition Hall, Klaipėda;
- 2000 „Painting”, (2000 10 25), Savickas’ Gallery, Vilnius;
- 1999 Personal Painting Exhibition, Gallery „Vartai”, Vilnius;
- 1998 „Ričardas Bartkevičius - Still-lives”, (1998 11 24 -12 14), Lithuanian National M. Mazvydas Library, Vilnius;
- 1997 „Spazieren gehen in die Farbe”, Artists Association Hall, Speyer, Germany;
- 1995 „Painting”, Lithuanian National Philharmonic, Vilnius;
- 1994 „Ričardas Bartkevičius – Pictures”, (1994 10 21 – 11 05), Gallery „Arka”, Vilnius;
- 1991 „Painting”. Exhibition of two authors, CAC, Vilnius;
- 1988 „Ričardas Bartkevičius – exhibition of painting”, (1988 04 30 – 06 01), Lithuanian National Republic Library, Vilnius;
- 1987 Personal Painting Exhibition, Lithuanian National Republic Library, Vilnius;
