= Nico Brüngger =

Swiss bicycle racer

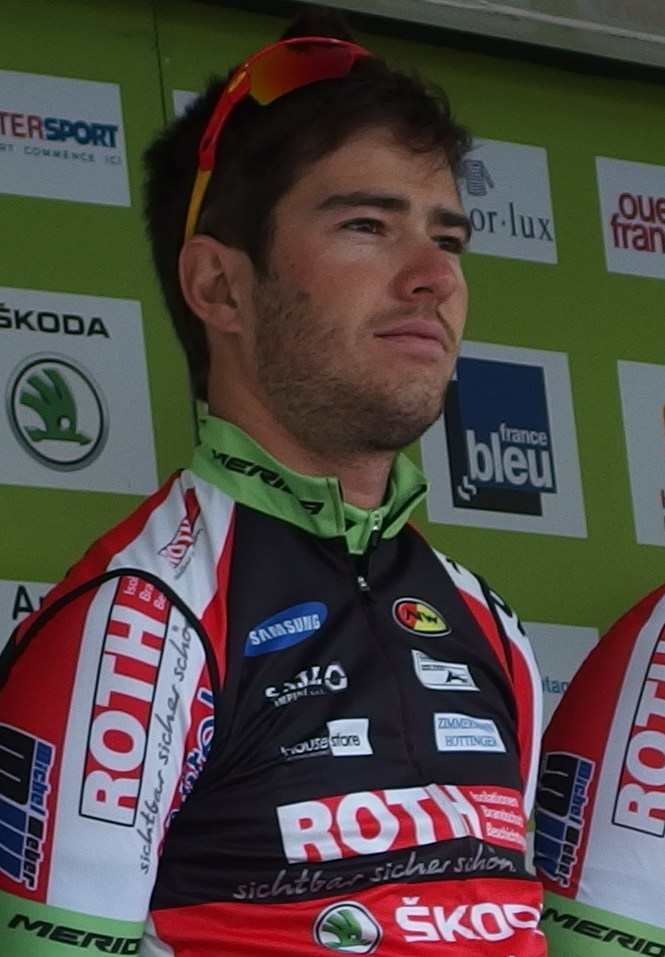

Personal information
- Born: 2 November 1988 (age 37) Switzerland

Cycling career
- Sport: Cycling
- Discipline: Road
- Role: Rider
- Rider type: Time-trialist

Amateur team
- 2011–2014: EKZ Racing

Professional team
- 2015–2016: Roth–Škoda

Nico Brüngger (born 2 November 1988) is a Swiss cyclist.

== Major results ==
2013
1st National Hill-Climb Championships
7th Overall Oberösterreichrundfahrt
2014
2nd Züri-Metzgete
