= Romain Villa =

French cyclist

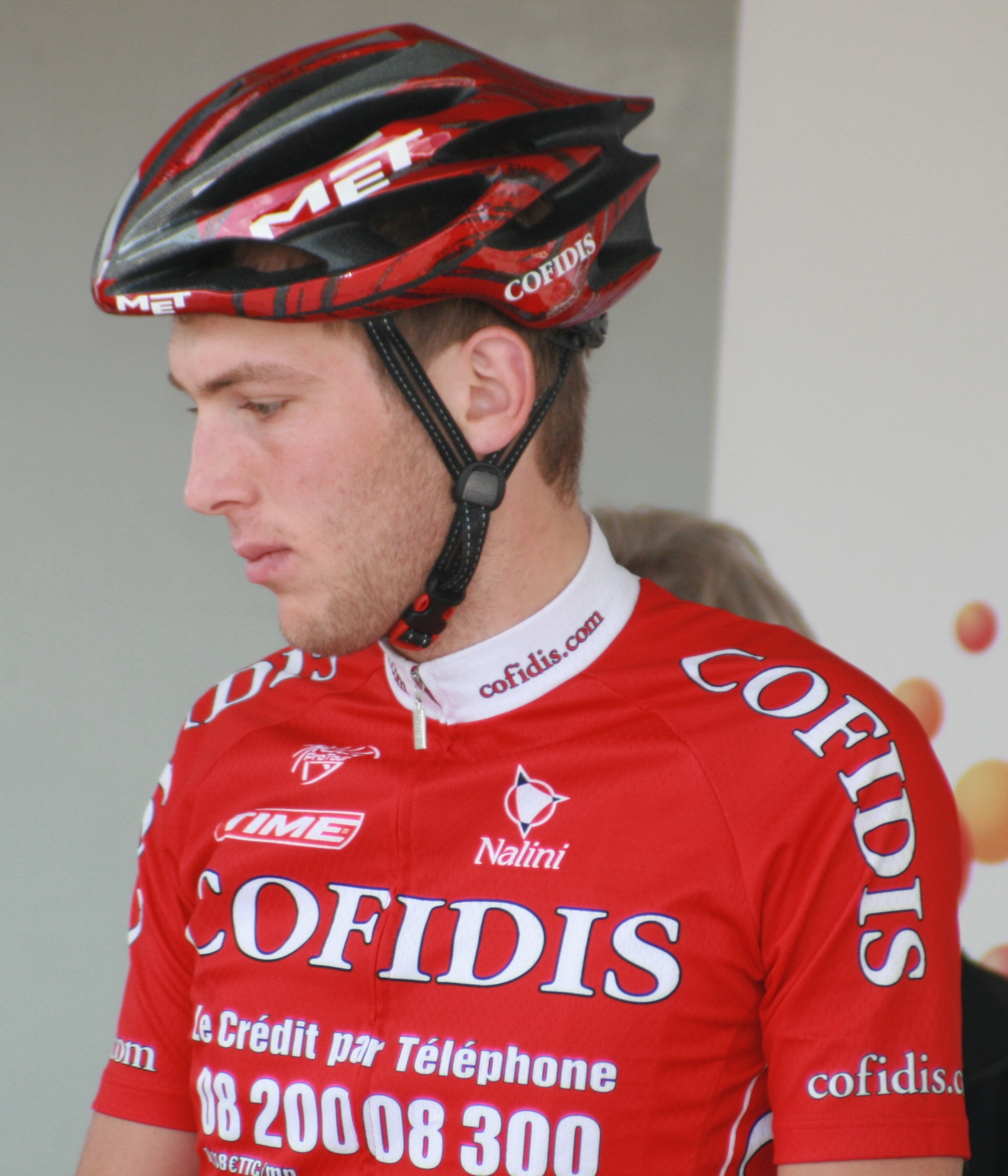

Personal information
- Full name: Romain Villa
- Born: 27 April 1985 (age 41) Charleville-Mézières, France

Cycling career
- Sport: Cycling
- Disciplines: Road; Cyclo-cross
- Role: Rider

Professional team
- 2007–2009: Cofidis

Romain Villa (born 27 April 1985 in Charleville-Mézières, Ardennes) is a French former road and cyclo-cross cyclist.

== Major results ==
=== Cyclo-cross ===
2000–2001
1st National Novice Championships
2001–2002
1st National Junior Championships
2002–2003
1st Overall Junior Coupe de France de cyclo-cross
2004–2005
1st National Under-23 Championships
1st Overall Under-23 Coupe de France de cyclo-cross
2005–2006
1st Overall Under-23 Coupe de France de cyclo-cross
2006–2007
1st National Under-23 Championships
3rd UCI Under-23 World Championships

=== Road ===
2007
1st Stage 4 Tour Alsace
10th La Côte Picarde
