= Drew Bartkiewicz =

American businessman

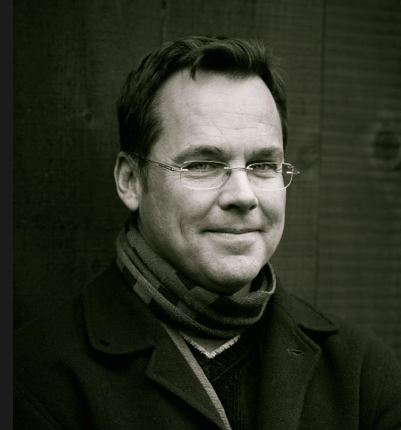
- Born: Drew Charles Bartkiewicz
- Occupations: Entrepreneur; Executive; Author
- Known for: Founder and CEO of lettrs
- Partner: Araceli Blasco
- Children: 3

Drew Bartkiewicz is an American businessman, executive, author and serial entrepreneur from Collinsville, Connecticut. He is best known as the founder and CEO of lettrs, an online platform for traditional letter writing. He formerly served as vice president of strategic services at Mashery and vice president of E&O in cyber and new media markets for The Hartford Financial Services Group, where he founded that company's technology and cyber-risk business. He has also been involved with the World Economic Forum's Future of the Internet initiative since 2009. As CEO, Drew Bartkiewicz signed the first collective bargaining agreement of a messaging network with the Major League Baseball Players association.

== Early life ==
Bartkiewicz is a graduate of the United States Military Academy at West Point with a degree in Aerospace Engineering and Yale University, where he received an MBA. He served as an officer with the United States Army's 82nd Airborne Division during the Gulf War.

== Career ==
Following Bartkiewicz's military career, he served as the vice president for BroadVision's Industry Solutions Group. He later became a director for Salesforce.com's business in Italy, Spain and Portugal. He also served as vice president and lead underwriter for Darwin Professional Underwriter's technology and information liability group, where he created Darwin Professional's Tech/404 product. Darwin Professional is a specialty insurance company.

He was a founder and CEO of CloudInsure, a company that underwrites insurance for cloud computing environments. He was also CEO of CyberRiskPartners, which develops risk management platforms for cloud computing companies. In 2010, Bartkiewicz founded CyberFactors, which provides platforms for the management of cyber risk and liability.

In 2011, Bartkiewicz became vice president of strategic services at Mashery, a provider of API enablement and management services. Intel purchased Mashery in 2013.

In 2012, Bartkiewicz co-founded the social messaging platform lettrs with his wife Araceli. The app has been featured in The Wall Street Journal, Time, BBC, and BusinessWeek. Bartkiewicz also created the lettrs Foundation, an organization that partners with schools and non-profits to improve literacy through social networking. In 2014, Bartkiewicz published Poetguese: A Utopia Where Words Matter, the First Book of lettrs in collaboration with author Paulo Coelho. The book contains a collection of mobile phone letter correspondences originally written in Portuguese with a foreword by Coelho.

Bartkiewicz's venture Twignature announced partnership with Dr. Harvey W. Schiller as a chairman of the company. In same year his property lettrs was also mentioned as Forbes Top 25 Veteran founded business. He is expanding the Twignature offering to verify, authenticate and "notarize" e-signatures on social networks and emerging currency networks like Blockchain and Bitcoin. Bartkiewicz was named by Goldman Sachs as One of Top 100 Most Intriguing Entrepreneurs of 2016, joining the company of earlier members, Elon Musk and Jack Dorsey.

== Bibliography ==
- Unseen Liability, The Irreversible Collision of Technology and Risk (ISBN 9780557816378)
- Unseen Wealth: Report of the Brookings Task Force on Intangibles (ISBN 9780815791256)
- Poetguese: A Utopia Where Words Matter, the First Book of Lettrs (ISBN 1502742934)

== Personal life ==
Bartkiewicz is the son of Barbara and Fred Bartkiewicz. He is married to Araceli Blasco of Madrid, Spain. Together they have two sons and a daughter.
