= Aurélien Duval =

French cyclist

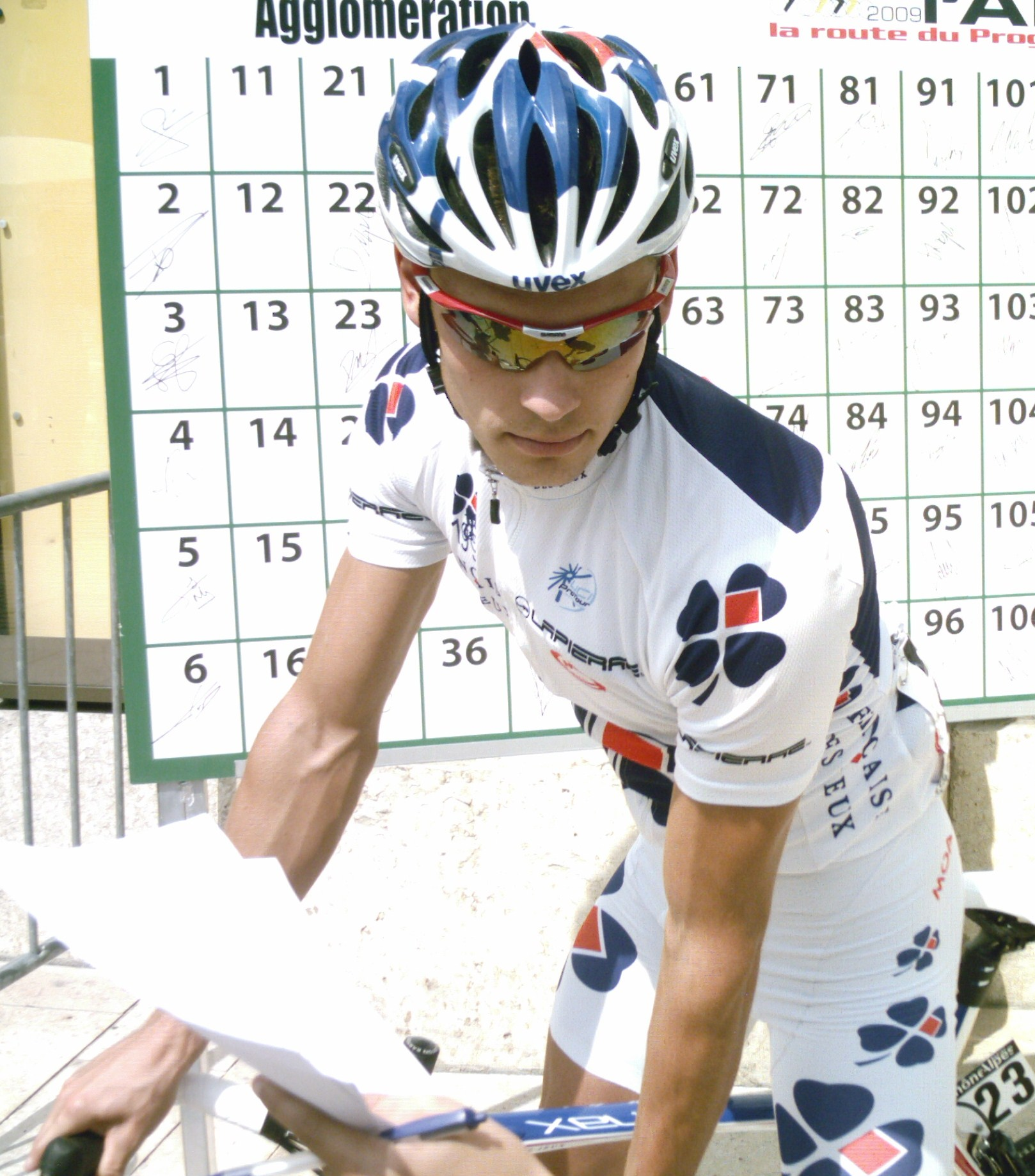

Personal information
- Born: 29 June 1988 (age 38) Sedan, Ardennes, France

Cycling career
- Sport: Cycling
- Current team: Retired
- Disciplines: Cyclo-cross; Road
- Role: Rider

Amateur teams
- 2008: Française des Jeux (stagiaire)
- 2011–2013: ECV Boulzicourt Adrisport

Professional team
- 2009: Française des Jeux
Medal record
Representing France
Men's cyclo-cross
World Championships
Silver medal – second place	2008 Treviso	Men's U23 race

Aurélien Duval (born 29 June 1988) is a French former professional cyclist. He ended his career during the 2013 season, after failing to find a team.

== Major results ==
=== Cyclo-cross ===
2005–2006
1st National Junior Championships
2006–2007
2nd National Under-23 Championships
Challenge La France Under-23

2nd Hénin-Beaumont

2007–2008
1st National Under-23 Championships
Challenge La France Under-23

1st Quelneuc
2nd Sarrebourg
2nd Cap d'Agde

2nd UCI Under-23 World Championships
2nd Overall UCI Under-23 World Cup

2nd Liévin
3rd Hoogerheide

2008–2009
2nd UEC European Under-23 Championships
2nd Overall UCI Under-23 World Cup

2nd Roubaix
2nd Tábor
3rd Heusden-Zolder

2011–2012
1st National Championships
1st Secheval
1st Nohan
1st Eteignére

=== Road ===
2006
1st Stage 1 Liège–La Gleize (TTT)
2nd Road race, National Junior Road Championships
2007
4th Road race, National Under-23 Road Championships
2008
2nd Flèche Ardennaise
3rd Grand Prix des Marbriers
7th Overall Giro delle Regioni
