= Cristian Cominelli =

Italian cyclist

Personal information
- Born: 22 May 1988 (age 38) Breno, Lombardy, Italy

Cycling career
- Sport: Cycling
- Disciplines: Cyclo-cross; Road; Cross-country
- Role: Rider

Amateur teams
- 2007–2008: Gewiss Bianchi
- 2009–2011: TX Active Bianchi

Professional team
- 2012: Team Idea

Cristian Cominelli (born 22 May 1988) is an Italian cyclo-cross cyclist.

== Major results ==
=== Cyclo-cross ===
2005–2006
1st National Junior Championships
UCI Junior World Cup

3rd Liévin

2006–2007
2nd National Under-23 Championships
2007–2008
1st National Under-23 Championships
2nd National Championships
2nd Faè
3rd UCI Under-23 World Championships
2008–2009
1st National Under-23 Championships
4th UCI Under-23 World Championships
5th Overall UCI Under-23 World Cup

2nd Heusden-Zolder

2009–2010
1st National Under-23 Championships
UCI Under-23 World Cup

3rd Treviso

2010–2011
2nd Milan
2011–2012
1st Asiago
2nd Frenkendorf
2nd Rome
3rd National Championships
Giro d'Italia Cross

3rd Isolaccia

3rd Hittnau
2015–2016
Giro d'Italia Cross

1st Portoferraio
1st Montalto di Castro

1st Brugherio
3rd National Championships
2016–2017
1st Vittorio Veneto
2017–2018
1st Vittorio Veneto
2nd Brugherio
2018–2019
2nd Overall SMP Master Cross
3rd Vittorio Veneto
3rd Gorizia
2019–2020
1st Jesolo
1st Cles
3rd Milan
2020–2021
3rd National Championships
2022–2023
3rd Brugherio
2023–2024
3rd Turin
3rd Firenze

=== MTB ===
2006
2nd Team relay, UCI World Championships
2008
3rd Team relay, UCI World Championships
2009
1st Team relay, UCI World Championships

=== Road ===
2012
7th Overall Course Cycliste de Solidarnosc et des Champions Olympiques
