= Yannick Eckmann =

American cyclist

Personal information
- Born: November 30, 1993 (age 32) Phoenix, Arizona, U.S.

Cycling career
- Sport: Cycling
- Disciplines: Cyclo-cross; Road
- Role: Rider

Amateur teams
- 2007–2008: Clif Bar Development Cyclo-cross Team
- 2009: Team 5280
- 2009: SV Kirchzarten
- 2010–2011: Hot Tubes Junior Development
- 2011: Pearl Izumi–Shimano
- 2012–2014: California Giant–Specialized
- 2015: Maxxis–Shimano
- 2016: North Memorial Health Care
- 2016: Gateway–Harley-Davidson–Trek
- 2016–2017: Boulder Cycle Sport

Professional team
- 2015: Roth–Škoda

Yannick Eckmann (born November 30, 1993) is an American road and cyclo-cross cyclist. He represented his nation in the men's elite event at the 2016 UCI Cyclo-cross World Championships in Heusden-Zolder. He finished eighth at the 2014 Ruota d'Oro, and rode for Roth–Škoda in 2015.
