= Hikaru Kosaka =

Japanese bicycle racer

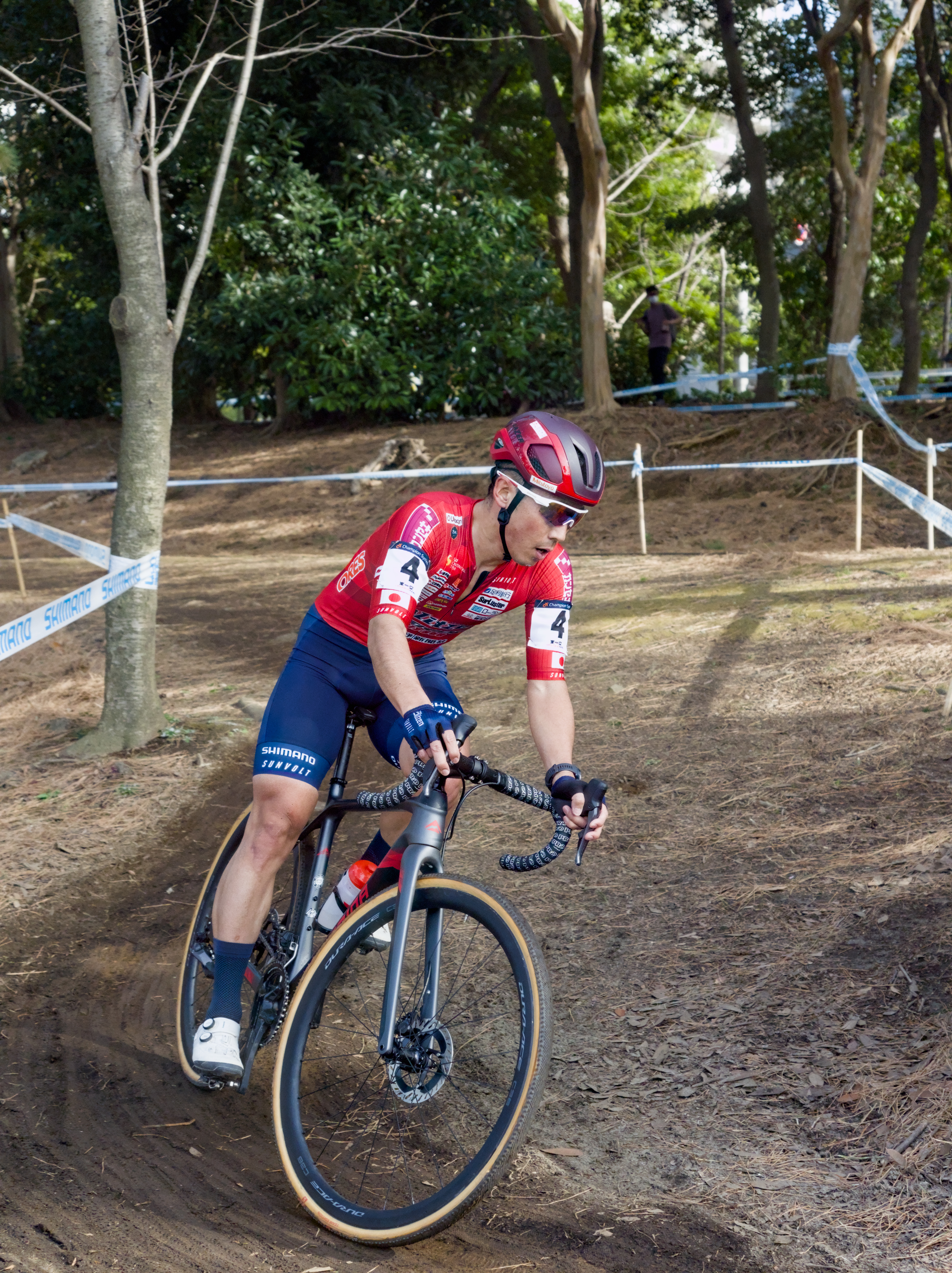
- Kosaka in 2023

Personal information
- Full name: Hikaru Kosaka
- Born: 21 October 1988 (age 37) Saku, Nagano, Japan
- Height: 1.72 m (5 ft 8 in)
- Weight: 62 kg (137 lb)

Cycling career
- Sport: Cycling
- Current team: Astemo Utsunomiya Blitzen
- Disciplines: Cyclo-cross; Road
- Role: Rider

Professional teams
- 2009–2011: Blitzen Utsunomiya Pro Racing
- 2015–2016: Nasu Blasen
- 2019–2023: Utsunomiya Blitzen
- 2024–: Velolien Matsuyama

Hikaru Kosaka (born 21 October 1988) is a Japanese cyclo-cross and road cyclist, who currently rides for UCI Continental team Velolien Matsuyama. He represented his nation in the men's elite event at the 2016 UCI Cyclo-cross World Championships in Heusden-Zolder.

== Major results ==
2010–2011
3rd Makino
2012–2013
2nd National Championships
2013–2014
2nd National Championships
3rd Yasu
2014–2015
2nd Makino
3rd National Championships
2015–2016
1st Inawashiro
2nd Makino
2nd Nobeyama
3rd National Championships
2016–2017
1st Sagae
2nd Makino
1st Nobeyama Day 1
3rd National Championships
2017–2018
1st National Championships
Tohoku CX Series

1st Makino
1st Sagae

1st Toride
2018–2019
Tohoku CX Series

1st ZAO-sama Cup
1st Sagae

2nd Starlight-cross
2nd Toride
3rd National Championships
2019–2020
Tohoku CX Series

1st ZAO-sama Cup
2nd Sagae

3rd National Championships
3rd Kansai
3rd Utsunomiya Day 1
3rd Yowamushi-Pedal Makuhari Cross
2021–2022
1st National Championships
2nd Kansai Grand Prix
3rd Nobeyama
2022–2023
3rd Nobeyama
3rd Utsunomiya Day 1
3rd Kansai
