= Andrzej Bartkiewicz =

Polish cyclist

Personal information
- Full name: Andrzej Bartkiewicz
- Born: 24 October 1991 (age 34)

Cycling career
- Sport: Cycling
- Disciplines: Road; Cyclo-cross; Track
- Role: Rider
- Rider type: Time trialist

Amateur team
- 2015: Whistle Team Ziemia Brzeska

Professional teams
- 2012–2013: Wibatech–LMGK Ziemia Brzeska
- 2014: Weltour–Guerciotti
- 2016–2017: Wibatech–Fuji
- 2018: Team Hurom

Andrzej Bartkiewicz (born 24 October 1991) is a Polish cyclist, who last rode for UCI Continental team Team Hurom.

== Major results ==
2007
1st Time trial, European Youth Olympic Festival
2009
1st Junior race, National Cyclo-cross Championships
2012
2nd Memoriał Andrzeja Trochanowskiego
2013
1st Individual pursuit, National Track Championships
2014
1st Stage 2 Bałtyk–Karkonosze Tour
2017
4th Memorial Grundmanna I Wizowskiego
2018
6th Memoriał Andrzeja Trochanowskiego
