= Marek Konwa =

Polish cyclist (born 1990)

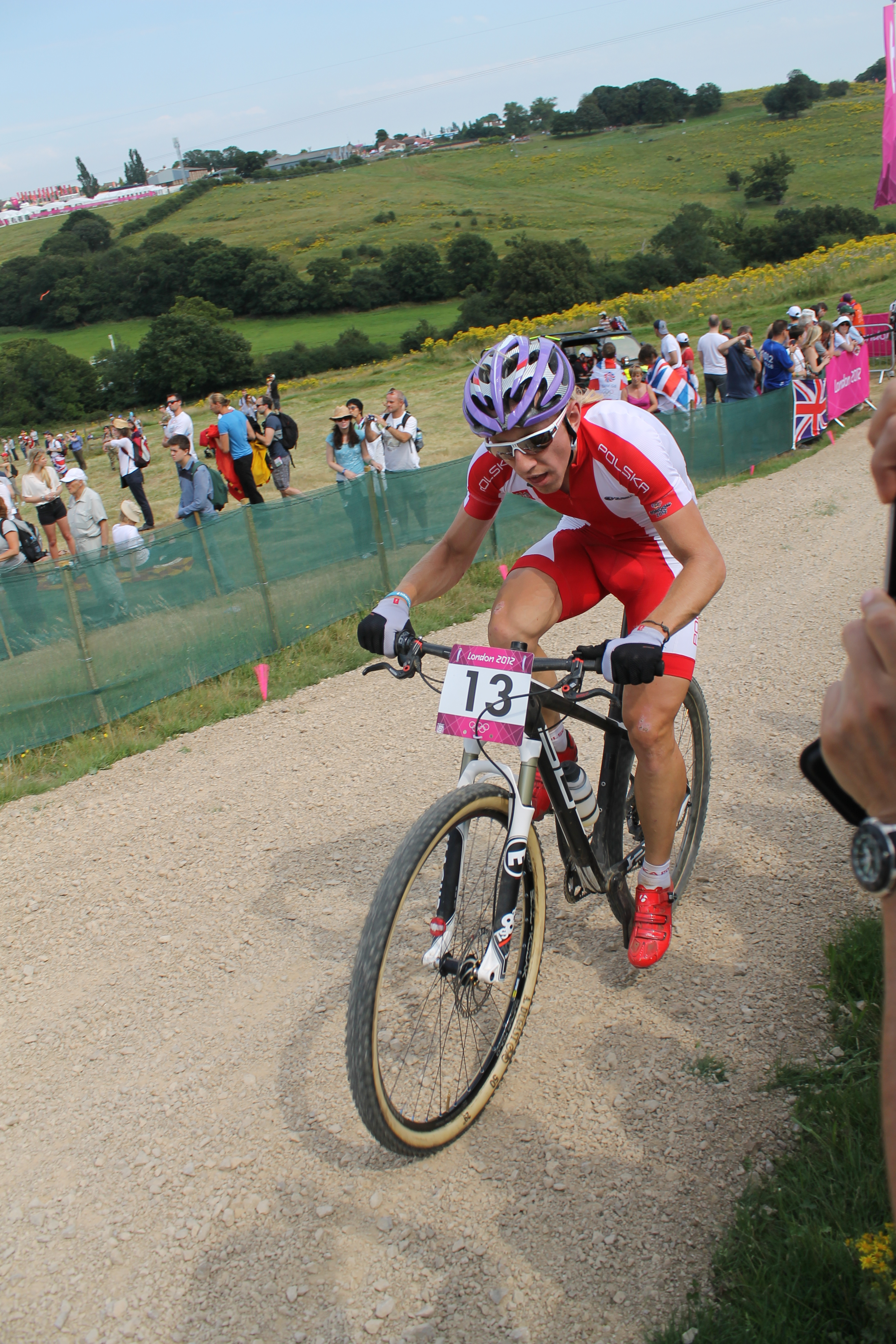
- Konwa at the 2012 Summer Olympics

Personal information
- Born: 11 March 1990 (age 36) Zielona Góra, Poland
- Height: 1.76 m (5 ft 9 in)
- Weight: 62 kg (137 lb)

Cycling career
- Sport: Cycling
- Current team: TJ Auto Skoda Mlada Boleslav
- Disciplines: Cyclo-cross; Mountain bike; Road; Gravel
- Role: Rider

Amateur teams
- 2021–2022: UKS Krupinsky Suszec-Konwa Bike
- 2024–: TJ Auto Skoda Mlada Boleslav

Professional team
- 2009: Team Utensilnord

Major wins
- Cyclo-cross National Championships (2013–2024) Mountain Bike National Championships (2012–2015, 2017, 2018)
Medal record
Men's cyclo-cross
Representing Poland
World Championships
Bronze medal – third place	Tabor 2010	Under-23 race
Men's mountain bike racing
World Championships
Silver medal – second place	2011 Champéry	Under-23 cross-country
World University Mountain Bike Championship
Gold medal – first place	2014 Jelenia Góra	Time Trial
Silver medal – second place	2014 Jelenia Góra	Cross Country

Marek Konwa (born 11 March 1990 in Zielona Góra) is a Polish cyclo cross and cross-country mountain biker. At the 2012 Summer Olympics, he competed in the Men's cross-country at Hadleigh Farm, finishing in 16th place. He was on the start list for the 2018 Cross-country European Championship and he finished in 21st place.

== Major results ==
=== Cyclo-cross ===
2006–2007
1st National Junior Championships
9th UCI World Junior Championships
2007–2008
1st Grand Prix Lille Métropole Juniors
1st Koppenbergcross Juniors
1st Gieten, Superprestige Juniors
3rd National Junior Championships
2008–2009
1st Veghel, Superprestige Under-23
2nd National Under-23 Championships
9th UCI World Under-23 Championships
2009–2010
3rd UCI World Under-23 Championships
2010–2011
1st National Under-23 Championships
2011–2012
1st National Under-23 Championships
1st Bryksy Cross
6th UCI World Under-23 Championships
2012–2013
1st National Championships
1st Bryksy Cross
2013–2014
1st National Championships
2014–2015
1st National Championships
2015–2016
1st National Championships
2016–2017
1st National Championships
3rd Overall Toi Toi Cup

2nd Kolín
3rd Holé Vrchy
3rd Jabkenice

2017–2018
1st National Championships
1st GP Poprad
3rd Overall Toi Toi Cup

1st Milovice
2nd Holé Vrchy
3rd Jabkenice

2018–2019
1st National Championships
2019-2020
1st National Championships
2020–2021
1st National Championships
Toi Toi Cup

1st Kolín

1st Bryksy Cross Gościęcin
2021–2022
1st National Championships
Toi Toi Cup

1st Hlinsko
2nd Veselí nad Lužnicí

1st Munich Super Cross
1st Int. Sparkassen Querfeldein GP Pferdezentrum Austria
1st Bryksy Cross Gościęcin
2022–2023
1st National Championships
Toi Toi Cup

1st Rýmařov
2nd Kolin
3rd Veselí nad Lužnicí

1st Mikołów
1st Gościęcin
1st Samorin 1
2nd Samorin 2
2nd Trnava
3rd Dohnany 2
2023–2024
1st National Championships
1st Overall Toi Toi Cup

1st Rýmařov
2nd Holé Vrchy
2nd Veselí nad Lužnicí
2nd Hlinsko
3rd Jičín

1st Gościęcin
1st Samorin 1
1st Samorin 2
1st Salvirola
1st Trnava
1st Ziar nad Hronom
1st Zielona Góra
2nd Selce
2024–2025
1st Trnava
1st Bad Salzdetfurth II
1st Levoca
HSF System Cup

2nd Hlinsko
3rd Ostrava II

=== Mountain bike ===
2009
2nd National Cross-country Championships
5th Under-23 Cross-country, UCI Mountain Bike World Championships
2010
2nd National Cross-country Championships
6th Under-23 Cross-country, UCI Mountain Bike World Championships
2011
2nd National Cross-country Championships
2nd Under-23 Cross-country, UCI Mountain Bike World Championships
5th Overall UCI Under-23 Cross-country World Cup
2012
1st National Cross-country Championships
2013
1st National Cross-country Championships
2014
World University Mountain Bike Championships

1st Time trial
2nd Cross-country

1st National Cross-country Championships
2015
1st National Cross-country Championships
2017
1st National Cross-country Championships
2018
2nd National Cross-country Championships

=== Road ===
2014
10th Overall Tour of Małopolska
2024
4th Road race, National Championships

=== Gravel ===
2024
2nd National Championships
