= Arnaud Grand =

Swiss cyclist

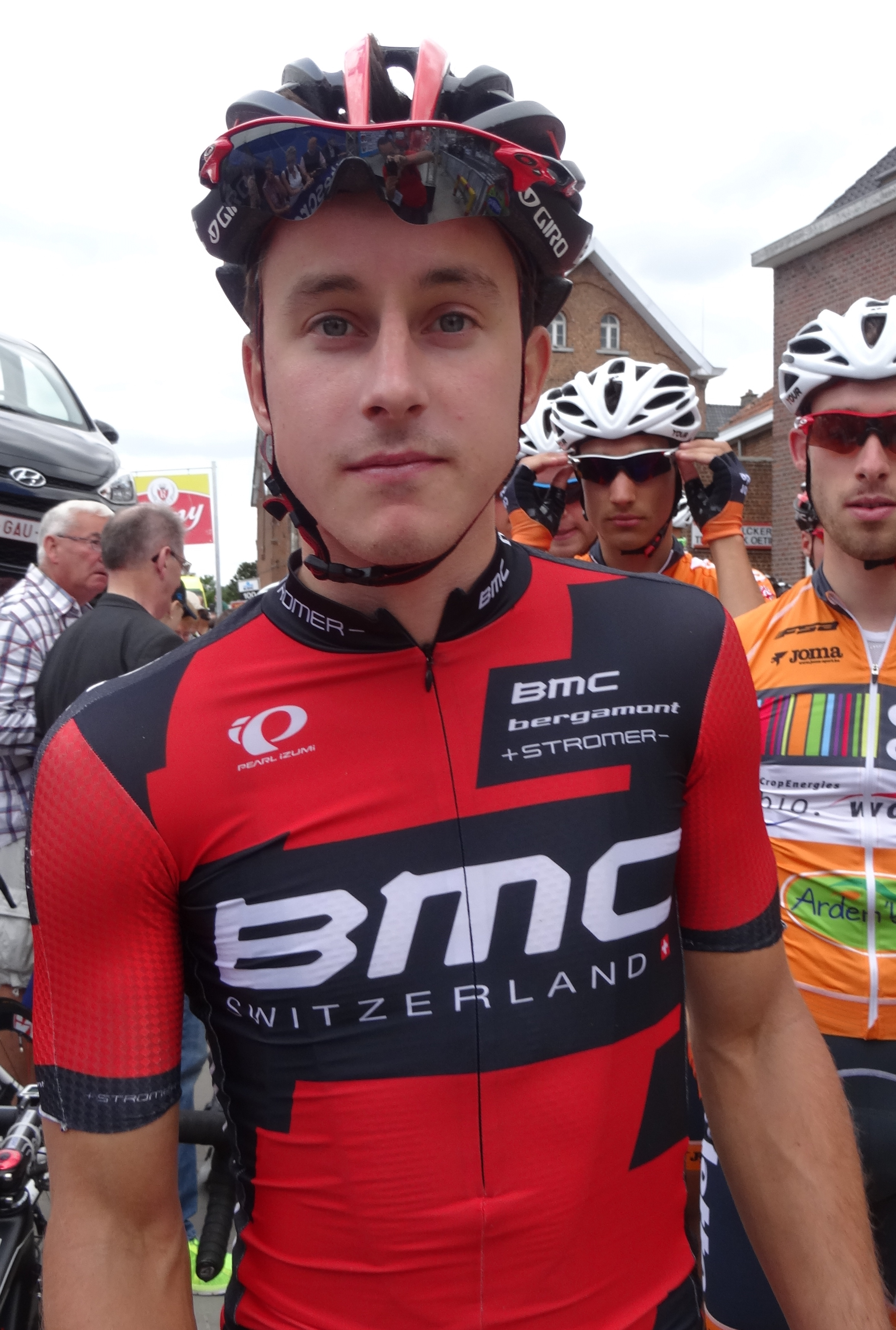
- Grand in 2014

Personal information
- Full name: Arnaud Grand
- Born: 28 August 1990 (age 36) Montreux, Switzerland

Cycling career
- Sport: Cycling
- Current team: Retired
- Disciplines: Cyclo-cross; Road
- Role: Rider

Amateur team
- 2013–2014: BMC Development Team

Professional team
- 2010–2012: Telenet–Fidea

Arnaud Grand (born 28 August 1990 in Montreux) is a Swiss former cyclo-cross and road cyclist.

== Major results ==
=== Cyclo-cross ===
2006–2007
2nd Junior race, National Championships
2009–2010
1st Under-23 race, National Championships
4th Under-23 race, UEC European Championships
4th Under-23 race, UCI World Championships
2010–2011
1st Under-23 race, National Championships
2011–2012
4th Overall UCI Under-23 World Cup
8th Under-23 race, UCI World Championships
2014–2015
1st Flückiger Cross Madiswil

=== Road ===
2013
1st Stage 2 Tour of the Gila
2014
4th Tour de Berne
