= Daniel Summerhill =

American cyclist

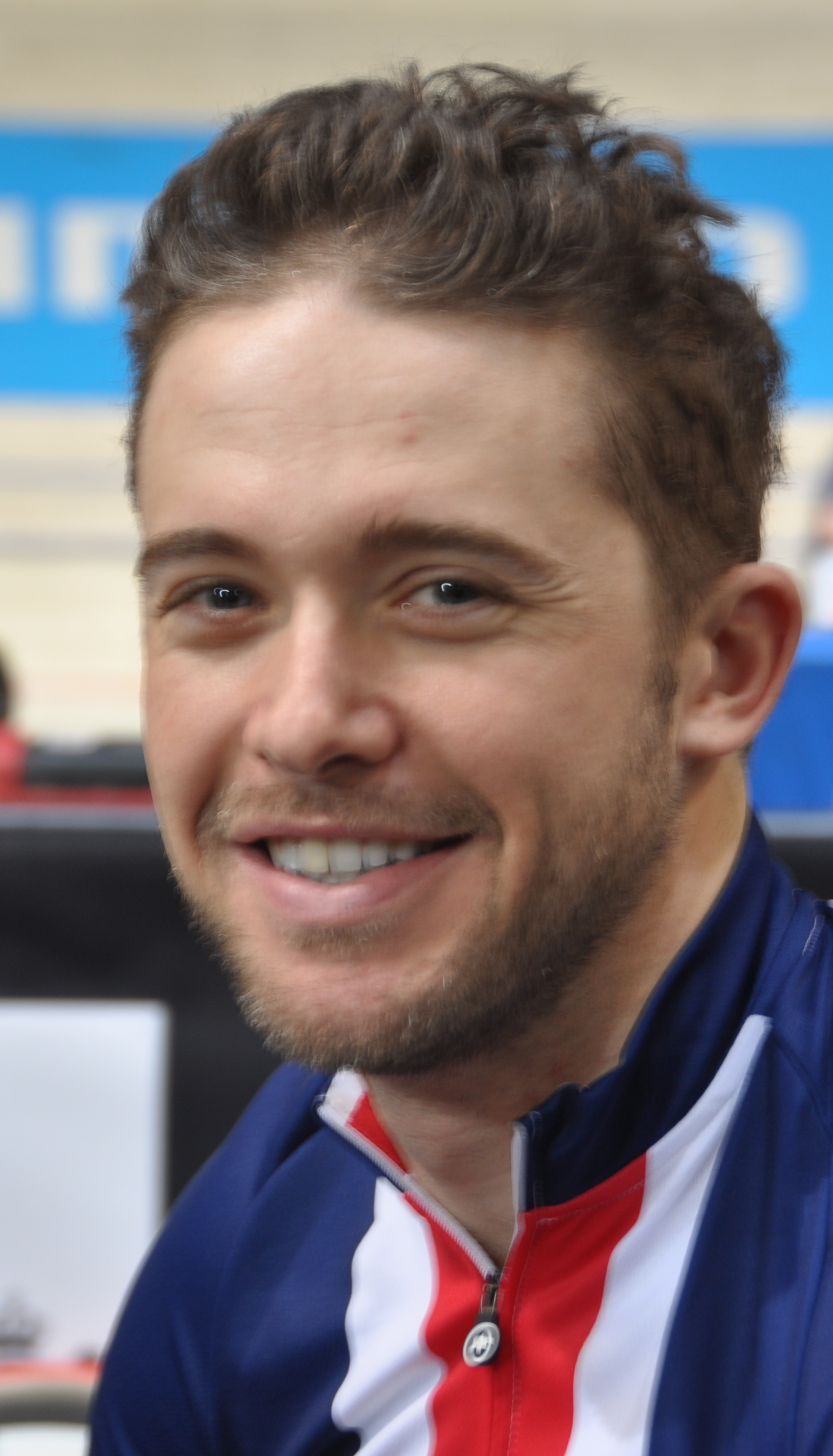
- Summerhill at the 2018 UCI Track Cycling World Championships

Personal information
- Full name: Daniel Summerhill
- Born: February 13, 1989 (age 37) Englewood, Colorado, U.S.
- Height: 1.85 m (6 ft 1 in)
- Weight: 70 kg (154 lb)

Cycling career
- Sport: Cycling
- Current team: American Cycling Group
- Disciplines: Road; Track; Cyclo-cross
- Role: Rider

Amateur teams
- 2018–2019: Texas Roadhouse Cycling
- 2021–2022: Best Buddies Racing
- 2023–: American Cycling Group

Professional teams
- 2011–2012: Chipotle–Garmin Development Team
- 2011: Garmin–Cervélo (stagiaire)
- 2012: UnitedHealthcare (stagiaire)
- 2013–2017: UnitedHealthcare
Medal record
Representing the United States
Men's cyclo-cross
World Championships
Silver medal – second place	2007 Hooglede	Junior race
Pan American Championships
Bronze medal – third place	2016 Cincinnati	Elite race
Men's track cycling
Pan American Championships
Silver medal – second place	2017 Couva	Team pursuit

Daniel Summerhill (born February 13, 1989 in Englewood, Colorado) is an American cyclist, who currently rides for Legion of Los Angeles.

He was suspended from the sport for one year in 2022 after a positive drugs test for Adderall.

== Major results ==
=== Road ===
2007
7th Road race, UCI Junior World Championships
9th Overall Tour de l'Abitibi

1st Stage 2 (TTT)

2008
7th Paris–Roubaix Espoirs
2010
3rd Overall Tour of China
2012
10th Grand Prix de la Ville de Lillers
2013
9th Bucks County Classic
2014
8th Overall Tour of Alberta
2015
1st The Reading 120
6th Philly Cycling Classic
2017
1st Stage 1 (ITT) Tour of Japan
7th Overall Tour de Taiwan

1st Stage 3

2018
1st Snake Alley Criterium
2nd Kwik Star Criterium
2019
1st Snake Alley Criterium
1st Kwik Star Criterium
2nd Athens Twilight Criterium
2021
1st Hapeville Criterium
1st Central Park Criterium
2022
1st Stage 3 Gateway Cup
2023
1st Overall Tulsa Tough

1st Stage 2

1st Salt Lake Criterium
1st Stage 10 Tour of America's Dairyland
2nd Overall Gateway Cup

1st Stage 3

2nd Athens Twilight Criterium
2nd Clarendon Cup

=== Cyclo-cross ===
2005–2006
1st National Junior Championships
1st Surf City Juniors
1st Gran Prix of Gloucester Juniors Day 1
2nd Gran Prix of Gloucester Juniors Day 2
2nd Golden Gate Cross Juniors
2nd Rad Racing GP Juniors
2nd Stumptown Classic Juniors
2006–2007
1st National Junior Championships
1st Xilinx Cup Juniors
1st Boulder Cup Juniors
2nd UCI Junior World Championships
Junior Superprestige

3rd Diegem

Junior GvA Trophy

3rd Baal

3rd Gran Prix of Gloucester Juniors Day 2
2007–2008
3rd National Under-23 Championships
2008–2009
3rd National Under-23 Championships
2009–2010
1st National Under-23 Championships
2010–2011
1st National Under-23 Championships
1st Krosstober-fest Weekend Day 2
2011–2012
3rd USGP of Cyclocross Day 1
2012–2013
2nd Boulder Cup
3rd Derby City Cup Day 1
2013–2014
1st Trek Collective Cup Day 2
3rd Derby City Cup Day 2
3rd CXLA Weekend Day 1
2014–2015
1st Ellison Park Festival Day 2
1st Day 1 & 2, Derby City Cup
1st Harbin Park Day 1
2nd Ellison Park Festival Day 1
2015–2016
1st Day 1 & 2, North Carolina Grand Prix
1st US Open of Cyclocross Day 2
2nd US Open of Cyclocross Day 1
3rd The Derby City Cup Day 2
2016–2017
2nd Gran Prix of Gloucester Day 1
2nd KingsCX Day 2
2nd Ruts N Guts Day 1
3rd Pan American Championships
3rd Jingle Cross C2 Race
3rd Gran Prix of Gloucester Day 2
3rd Rochester Day 2
3rd KMC Cyclo-cross Festival Day 2

=== Track ===
2017
1st Team pursuit (with Adrian Hegyvary, Daniel Holloway & Gavin Hoover), National Championships
2nd Team pursuit, Pan American Championships
2018
2nd Team pursuit, Hong Kong, UCI World Cup
2023
1st Madison (with Brendan Rhim), National Championships
