= Karel Hník =

Czech cyclist

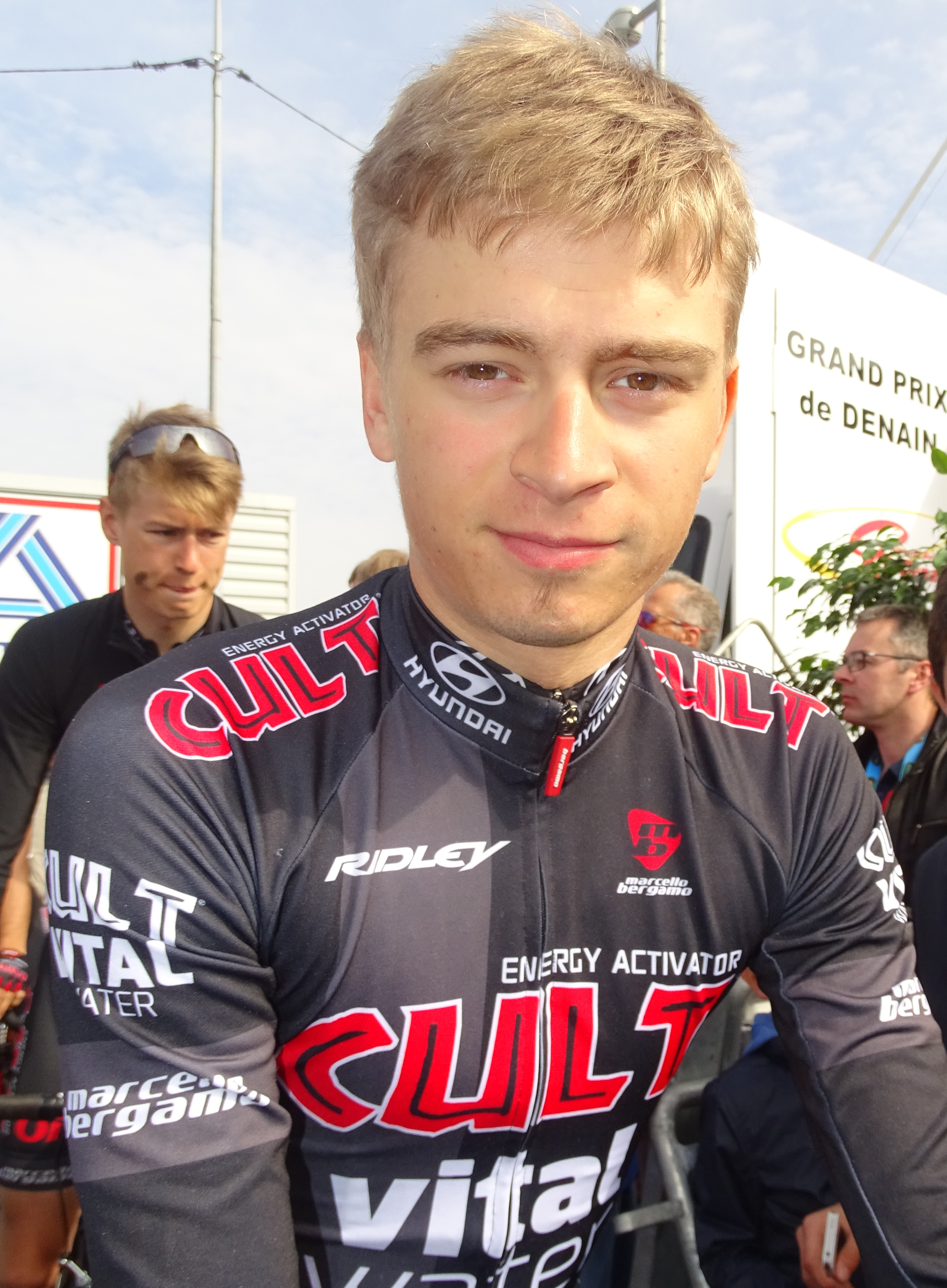
- Hník in 2015

Personal information
- Full name: Karel Hník
- Born: 9 August 1991 (age 35) Jilemnice, Czech Republic
- Height: 1.73 m (5 ft 8 in)
- Weight: 54 kg (119 lb)

Cycling career
- Sport: Cycling
- Disciplines: Road; Cyclo-cross
- Role: Rider

Amateur teams
- 2009–2011: Telenet–Fidea
- 2012: Sunweb–Revor
- 2013–2014: Etixx–IHNed
- 2017: Topforex–Lapierre
- 2021: D2mont Merida

Professional teams
- 2014: MTN–Qhubeka (stagiaire)
- 2015: Cult Energy Pro Cycling
- 2016: Verva ActiveJet
- 2018: Pardus–TUFO Prostějov
- 2019–2020: Elkov–Author
- 2021: Efapel
Medal record
Representing Czech Republic
Men's cyclo-cross
World Championships
Bronze medal – third place	2011 Sankt Wendel	Men's under-23 race

Karel Hník (born 9 August 1991) is a Czech racing cyclist, who last rode for UCI Continental team Efapel.

== Major results ==
2008
3rd Junior race, National Cyclo-cross Championships
2011
3rd Under-23 race, UCI World Cyclo-cross Championships
2012
1st Road race, National Under-23 Road Championships
3rd National Cyclo-cross Championships
2013
1st Mountains classification Volta ao Alentejo
2nd Coupe des Carpathes
2014
1st Overall Tour Alsace

1st Stage 4

2nd Overall Istrian Spring Trophy
3rd Overall Volta ao Alentejo

1st Stage 4

4th Overall Troféu Joaquim Agostinho

1st Stage 3

5th Overall Oberösterreichrundfahrt
2016
4th Overall Czech Cycling Tour
4th Velothon Wales
6th Visegrad 4 Bicycle Race – GP Polski
2018
8th Visegrad 4 Bicycle Race – GP Czech Republic
2019
3rd Overall Tour of Bihor
4th Overall Flèche du Sud
8th Overall Czech Cycling Tour
9th Overall Tour de Hongrie
9th Overall Tour Alsace
