= Kenneth Hansen (cyclist) =

Danish cyclist

Personal information
- Born: 7 October 1991 (age 35)

Cycling career
- Sport: Cycling
- Discipline: Cyclo-cross
- Role: Rider

Kenneth Hansen (born 7 October 1991) is a Danish male cyclo-cross cyclist. He represented his nation in the men's elite event at the 2016 UCI Cyclo-cross World Championships in Heusden-Zolder.
