= Jiří Polnický =

Czech cyclist

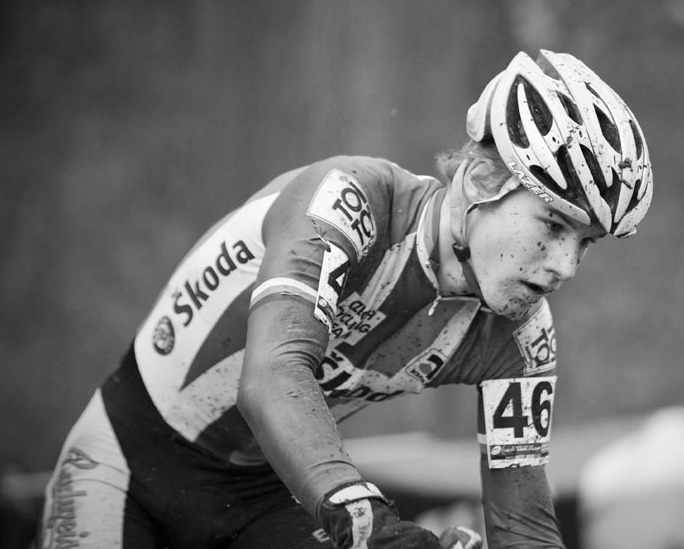
- Polnický in 2010

Personal information
- Full name: Jiří Polnický
- Born: 16 December 1989 (age 36): Mladá Boleslav, Czechoslovakia; (now Czech Republic)
- Height: 1.83 m (6 ft 0 in)
- Weight: 68 kg (150 lb)

Cycling career
- Sport: Cycling
- Current team: Retired
- Disciplines: Road; Cyclo-cross
- Role: Rider

Professional teams
- 2009–2011: Sunweb–Projob
- 2012–2015: Whirlpool–Author
- 2016: Verva ActiveJet
- 2017–2019: Elkov–Author

Jiří Polnicky (born 16 December 1989 in Mladá Boleslav) is a Czech former professional cyclist.

== Major results ==
2007
3rd Junior race, UCI Cyclo-cross World Championships
2012
1st Stage 1 (TTT) Czech Cycling Tour
3rd Road race, National Road Championships
2013
3rd Tour Bohemia
9th Overall Czech Cycling Tour
9th Memoriał Andrzeja Trochanowskiego
2014
4th Road race, National Road Championships
6th GP Hungary, Visegrad 4 Bicycle Race
2015
Visegrad 4 Bicycle Race

2nd GP Czech Republic
9th GP Hungary

3rd Overall Szlakiem Grodów Piastowskich
4th Road race, National Road Championships
5th Puchar Uzdrowisk Karpackich
9th Rund um Sebnitz
9th Memoriał Andrzeja Trochanowskiego
10th Overall Okolo Slovenska
2016
2nd GP Czech Republic, Visegrad 4 Bicycle Race
3rd Overall Szlakiem Grodów Piastowskich

1st Stage 3

9th Overall Bałtyk–Karkonosze Tour
2017
6th Puchar Ministra Obrony Narodowej
7th Overall Czech Cycling Tour

1st Stage 1 (TTT)

7th Poreč Trophy
10th Overall East Bohemia Tour
10th Szlakiem Wielkich Jezior
10th Memoriał Romana Siemińskiego
2018
3rd GP Adria Mobil
9th Overall Circuit des Ardennes
10th Overall Istrian Spring Trophy
