= Yu Takenouchi =

Japanese male cyclist (born 1988)

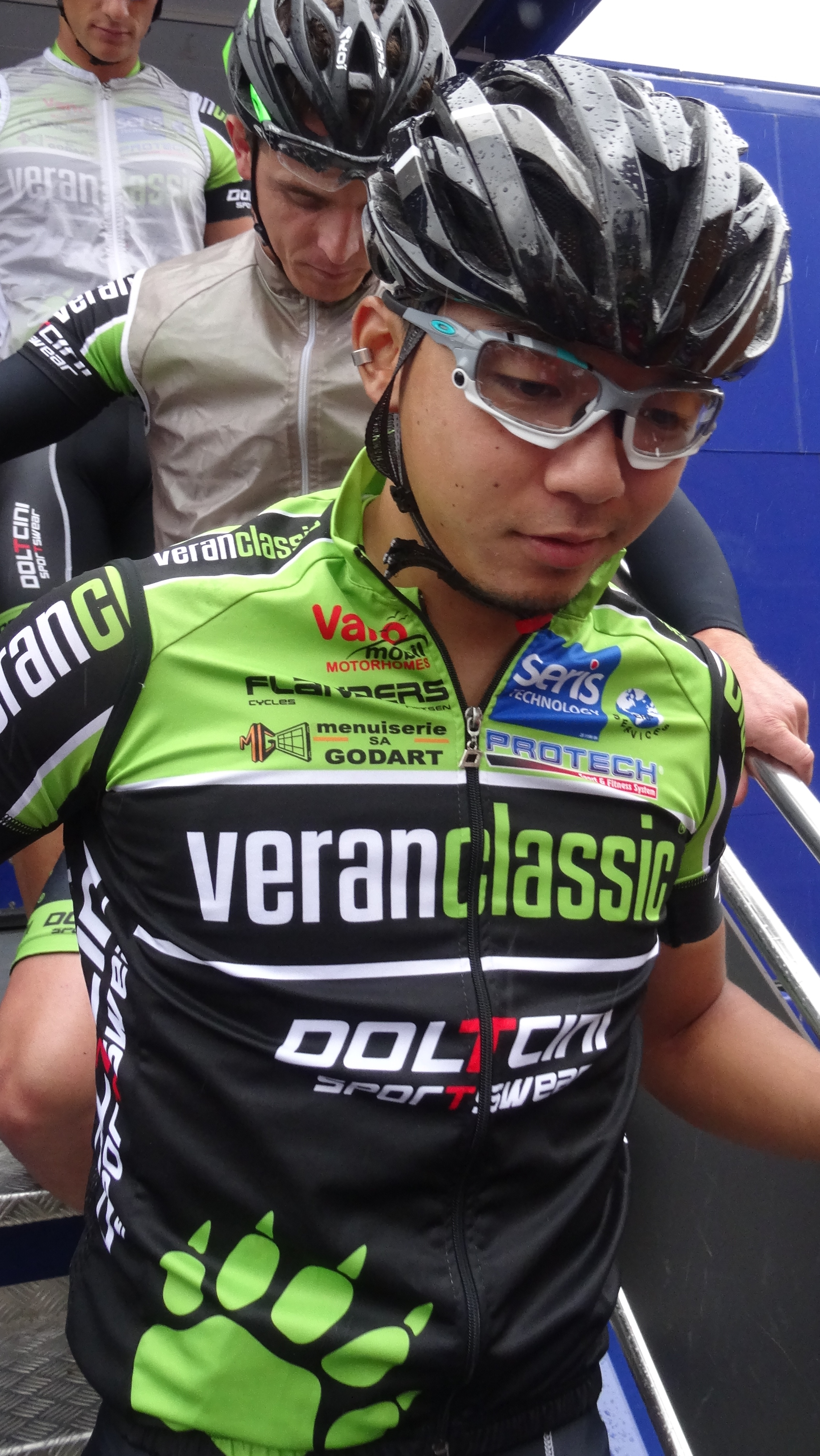

Personal information
- Born: 1 September 1988 (age 38) Saitama, Japan

Cycling career
- Sport: Cycling
- Disciplines: Cyclo-cross; Road
- Role: Rider

Amateur team
- 2010–2012: Team Eurasia–Musseuw Bikes

Professional teams
- 2008–2009: Trek–Marco Polo
- 2012–2013: Colba–Superano Ham
- 2014–2015: Veranclassic–Doltcini

Yu Takenouchi (竹之内 悠, Takenouchi Yū; born 1 September 1988) is a Japanese cyclist who competes in both cyclo-cross and road cycling. He won the Japanese national cyclo-cross championship five times in a row from 2011 to 2015. He represented his nation in the men's elite event at the 2016 UCI Cyclo-cross World Championships in Heusden-Zolder. In 2015, he was a member of the Belgian team Veranclassic–Ekoi.

== Major results ==
=== Cyclo-cross ===
2006–2007
2nd National Under-23 Championships
2010–2011
2nd National Championships
2011–2012
1st National Championships
1st Nobeyama
2nd Yasu
2012–2013
1st National Championships
1st Nobeyama
1st Yasu
2013–2014
1st National Championships
1st Nobeyama Day 1
1st Nobeyama Day 2
1st Yasu
2014–2015
1st National Championships
2015–2016
1st National Championships
1st Nobeyama
2017–2018
3rd Nobeyama Day 1
2019–2020
2nd National Championships
2021–2022
3rd National Championships
2022–2023
2nd Nobeyama
3rd National Championships

=== Road ===
2012
8th Grand Prix de la ville de Pérenchies
2013
8th Grand Prix Criquielion
