= Joeri Adams =

Belgian cyclist

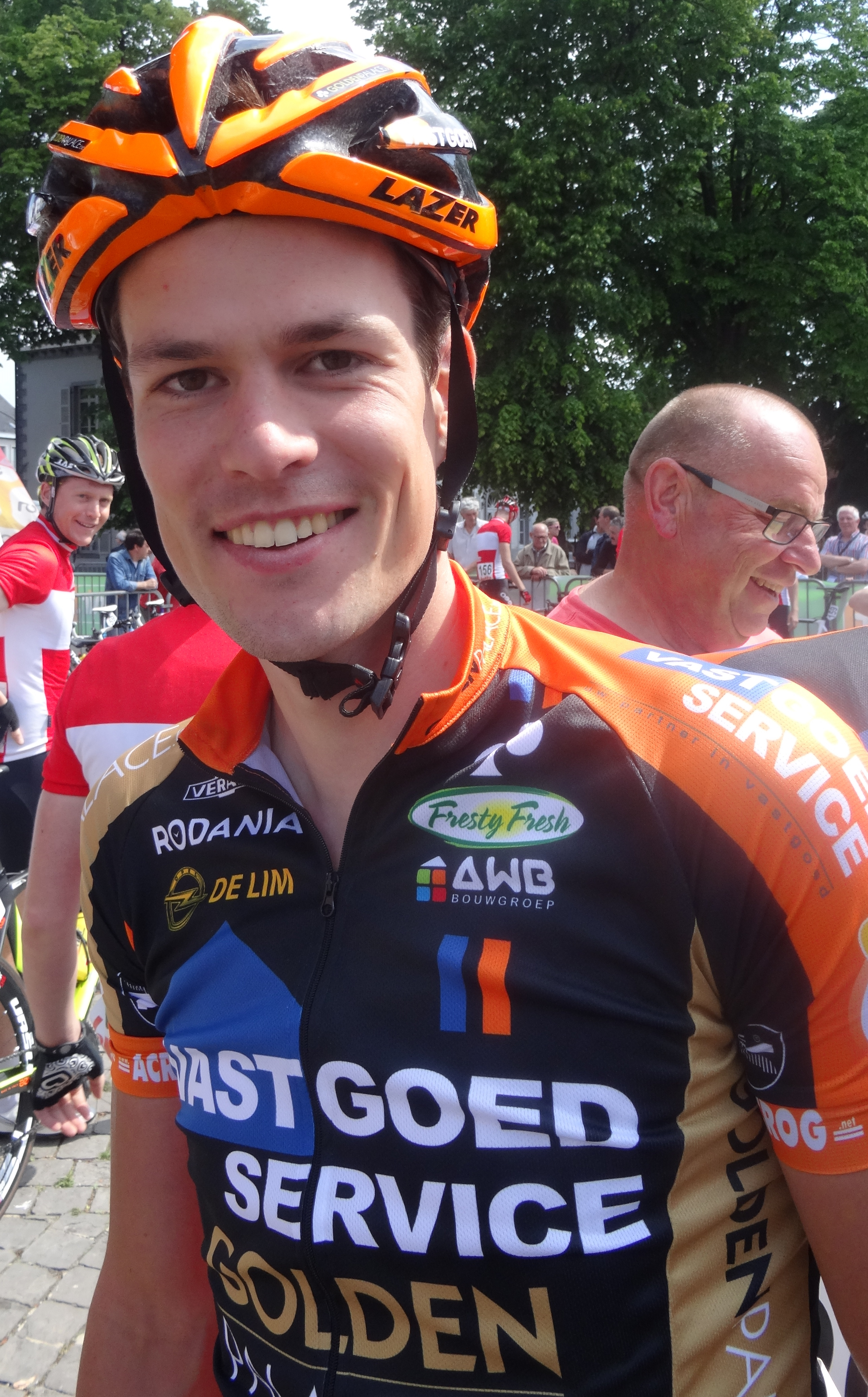
- Adams in 2014

Personal information
- Full name: Joeri Adams
- Born: 15 October 1989 (age 37) Turnhout, Belgium
- Height: 1.81 m (5 ft 11 in)
- Weight: 63 kg (139 lb)

Cycling career
- Sport: Cycling
- Current team: Retired
- Disciplines: Cyclo-cross; Road
- Role: Rider

Amateur teams
- 2010–2011: Rabobank–Giant Off-Road
- 2016–2018: Kalas–H.Essers–NNOF

Professional teams
- 2007–2010: Rabobank Continental Team
- 2011–2013: Telenet–Fidea
- 2014–2016: Vastgoedservice–Golden Palace

Joeri Adams (born 15 October 1989, in Turnhout) is a Belgian former cyclist.

== Major results ==
=== Cyclo-cross ===
2006–2007
1st UCI Junior World Championships
1st Overall UCI Junior World Cup

1st Hofstade
1st Nommay

Junior Superprestige

1st Asper-Gavere
1st Diegem
1st Vorselaar

2nd UEC European Junior Championships
2010–2011
1st National Under-23 Championships
Under-23 DVV Trophy

1st Oudenaarde
2nd Namur
2nd GP Sven Nys

3rd UEC European Under-23 Championships
3rd Cauberg Under-23
5th Overall UCI Under-23 World Cup
2011–2012
1st GP de la Commune de Contern
2012–2013
3rd Grand Prix Möbel Alvisse
2014–2015
1st Grand Prix Möbel Alvisse
2015–2016
1st National Amateur Championships
1st Grand Prix Möbel Alvisse
1st Cyclo-cross du Mingant
2016–2017
2nd Grand Prix Möbel Alvisse
3rd Balan Ardennes
2017–2018
2nd Grand Prix Möbel Alvisse

=== Road ===
2007
3rd Overall Liège–La Gleize

1st Stage 3
