= Arnaud Jouffroy =

French cyclo-cross cyclist and bicycle racer

Personal information
- Born: 21 February 1990 (age 36) Senlis, France

Cycling career
- Sport: Cycling
- Disciplines: Cyclo-cross; Road; Mountain Bike
- Role: Rider

Amateur team
- 2009: Vendée U

Professional teams
- 2010: BKCP–Powerplus
- 2011–2013: Telenet–Fidea

Arnaud Jouffroy (French: [aʁno ʒufʁwa]; born 21 February 1990) is a French professional cyclo-cross cyclist. After retiring in 2014, he returned to competition in 2019. He has also competed in road cycling and cross-country mountain biking.

== Major results ==
=== Cyclo-cross ===
2005–2006
1st National Novice Championships
2006–2007
1st National Junior Championships
UCI Junior World Cup

1st Hoogerheide

2007–2008
1st UCI Junior World Championships
1st Overall UCI Junior World Cup

1st Milan
1st Hoogerheide
1st Kalmthout
1st Liévin

1st National Junior Championships
2nd UEC European Junior Championships
2008–2009
1st National Under-23 Championships
1st Overall Coupe de France de cyclo-cross Under-23

1st Montrevel-en-Bresse
1st Le Creusot
1st Quelneuc

2009–2010
1st UCI World Under-23 Championships
Gazet van Antwerpen Trophy Under-23

1st Grand Prix Sven Nys

2nd National Under-23 Championships
3rd Overall UCI Under-23 World Cup
2010–2011
Gazet van Antwerpen Trophy Under-23

1st Cyclo-cross de la Citadelle

2013–2014
2nd China International Cyclo-cross event

=== Road ===
2008
1st Overall Tour de l'Abitibi
1st Overall Giro della Toscana Juniors
2009
1st Stage 3 (ITT) Tour de Martinique

=== Mountain Bike ===
2008
1st UCI World Team Relay Championships
1st UEC European Team Relay Championships
2nd UCI Junior World XCO Championships
