= 2007 in women's cyclo-cross =

== News ==
=== January ===
- 1 – Maryline Salvetat wins the first race of 2007, the Grand Prix du Nouvel-An held in Pétange. She finished the race 25 seconds ahead of World Champion and 2006 winner Marianne Vos, while Daphny van den Brand followed in third position. velostory.net
- 7 – Loes Sels, Maryline Salvetat, Hanka Kupfernagel, Helen Wyman and Daphny van den Brand are crowned as the new national champions of the top nations in the sport. For Van den Brand it was the ninth time in her career. dewielersite.net
- 14 – Laurence Leboucher wins the World Cup meeting in her home nation France. In the Grand Prix Nommay she was faster than her French colleague Maryline Salvetat. Hanka Kupfernagel, who finished in third position remains the World Cup leader. cyclingnews.com
- 28 – Maryline Salvetat claims the rainbow jersey as she keeps a slight gap to Katie Compton who takes the silver with the top favourites unable to win any medal. cyclingnews.com

== World championships ==
Pos.	Cyclist	Time
1st place, gold medalist(s)	(France) Maryline Salvetat	42.57
2nd place, silver medalist(s)	(United States) Katie Compton	+ 0.01
3rd place, bronze medalist(s)	(France) Laurence Leboucher	+ 0.09
4.	(Netherlands) Daphny van den Brand	+ 0.31
5.	(Germany) Hanka Kupfernagel	+ 0.41

== World Cup ==
Date	Place	Winner	Leader
22 October 2006	(Belgium) Cyclo-cross Kalmthout	(Germany) Hanka Kupfernagel	(Germany) Hanka Kupfernagel
4 November 2006	(Italy) Grand Prix Lago le Bandie	(Netherlands) Marianne Vos	(Germany) Hanka Kupfernagel
12 November 2006	(Netherlands) Veldrit Pijnacker	(Germany) Hanka Kupfernagel	(Germany) Hanka Kupfernagel
26 December 2006	(Belgium) Kersttrofee Hofstade	(Germany) Hanka Kupfernagel	(Germany) Hanka Kupfernagel
14 January 2007	(France) Grand Prix Nommay	(France) Laurence Leboucher	(Germany) Hanka Kupfernagel
21 January 2007	(Netherlands) Grand Prix Adrie van der Poel	(Germany) Hanka Kupfernagel	(Germany) Hanka Kupfernagel

== Superprestige ==
Date	Place	Winner	Second	Third
29 October 2006	(Netherlands) Super Prestige Sint-Michielsgestel	(Netherlands) Arenda Grimberg	(Belgium) Sanne Cant	(Belgium) Anja Nobus
19 November 2006	(Belgium) Superprestige Gavere	(Belgium) Hilde Quintens	(Netherlands) Reza Hormes-Ravenstijn	(Belgium) Veerle Ingels
26 November 2006	(Netherlands) Superprestige Gieten	(Netherlands) Marianne Vos	(Netherlands) Reza Hormes-Ravenstijn	(Germany) Susanne Juranek

== Gazet van Antwerpen ==
Date	Place	Winner	Second	Third
1 November 2006	(Belgium) Cyclo-cross Koppenberg	(Netherlands) Marianne Vos	(Netherlands) Reza Hormes-Ravenstijn	(Netherlands) Daphny van den Brand
28 December 2006	(Belgium) Azencross	(Germany) Hanka Kupfernagel	(Netherlands) Daphny van den Brand	(Netherlands) Marianne Vos
3 February 2006	(Belgium) Krawatencross	(Netherlands) Reza Hormes-Ravenstijn	(Belgium) Loes Sels	(Belgium) Sanne Cant

== Other 2007 Cyclo-cross races ==
Date	Place	Winner	Second	Third
1 January 2007	(Luxembourg) Grand Prix du Nouvel-An	(France) Maryline Salvetat	(Netherlands) Marianne Vos	(Netherlands) Daphny van den Brand
3 January 2007	(Netherlands) Centrumcross Surhuisterveen	(Germany) Nicole Kampeter	(Japan) Mika Ogishima	(Netherlands) Linda ter Beek
10 January 2007	(Belgium) Scheldecross Antwerpen	(Netherlands) Marianne Vos	(Netherlands) Reza Hormes-Ravenstijn	(Belgium) Veerle Ingels
14 January 2007	(England) Derby Cyclo-cross Series	(United Kingdom) Isla Rowntree	(United Kingdom) Gabriella Day	(United Kingdom) Annie Last

== National championships ==
Date	Country	Elite	U23	Junior
7 January	Austria	Stephanie Wiedner; Monika Schachl; Elke Riedl		
7 January	Belgium	Loes Sels; Katrien Aerts; Hilde Quintens		Sanne Cant; Ilse Vanderkinderen; Kelly Druyts
7 January	Denmark	Karen Jacobsen; Nikoline Hansen; Janni Nielsen		
7 January	France	Maryline Salvetat; Laurence Leboucher; Christel Ferrier-Bruneau		
6 January	Germany	Hanka Kupfernagel; Birgit Hollmann; Susanne Juranek		Christina Lüdtke; Romy Schneider; Alexandra Janke
7 January	United Kingdom	Helen Wyman; Gabriella Day; Isla Rowntree		Rebecca Thompson; Corrine Hall; Becky James
6 January	Ireland	Tarja Owens; Ciara McManus; C. Patterson		
6 January	Italy	Vania Rossi; Milena Cavani; Francesca Cucciniello	Ilaria Rinaldi; Elisabetta Borgia; Veronica Alessio	Valeria Tagliabue; Giulia De Maio; Martina Giovanniello
7 January	Luxembourg	Nathalie Lamborelle; Suzie Godart; Christine Majerus		
6 January	Netherlands	Daphny van den Brand; Marianne Vos; Reza Hormes-Ravenstijn		
7 January	Poland	Magdalena Pyrgies; Marlena Pyrgies; Dorota Warczyk		Magdalena Wójkiewicz; Marta Sulek; Natalia Piasecka
12 January	Spain	Rocio Gamonal Ferrara; Rosa Maria Bravo Soba; Ruth Moll Marques		Lucia González; Maria José Gomez Lopez; Alba Diez
7 January	Switzerland	Katrin Leumann; Franziska Röthlin; Alexandra Bähler		Vivianne Meyer; Jasmin Achermann; Jennifer Sagesser
