= 2007 UCI Cyclo-cross World Championships – Women's elite race =

Women's Elite Cyclo-cross Race
2007 UCI Cyclo-cross World Championships
- Rainbow jersey

Race details
- Dates: January 28, 2007
- Stages: 1
- Winning time: 42' 57"

Medalists
	Gold	Maryline Salvetat (FRA)
	Silver	Katie Compton (USA)
	Bronze	Laurence Leboucher (FRA)

The 2007 UCI Cyclo-cross World Championships – Women's elite race was held on Sunday 28 January 2007 as a part of the 2007 UCI Cyclo-cross World Championships in Hooglede-Gits, Belgium.

== Summary ==
With defending champion Marianne Vos unable to keep up with the pace and her compatriot Daphny van den Brand crashing in the early stage of the race top favourite Hanka Kupfernagel started great and took the lead. Halfway through the race she suffered a mechanical problem and was dropped back. As a result two French outsiders Maryline Salvetat and Laurence Leboucher were in the lead alongside surprising American Katie Compton. In the final round Leboucher dropped the pace and Compton had to close the gap towards Salvetat, but eventually failed, resulting in the rainbow jersey for Salvetat. Compton clinched the silver and Leboucher won a bronze medal.

== Ranking ==
Rank	Cyclist	Time
Gold medal	Maryline Salvetat (FRA)	42:57,8
Silver medal	Katie Compton (USA)	+ 0:01,2
Bronze medal	Laurence Leboucher (FRA)	+ 0:09,0
4	Daphny Van Den Brand (NED)	+ 0:31,9
5	Hanka Kupfernagel (GER)	+ 0:41,8
6	Christel Ferrier-Bruneau (FRA)	+ 0:43,6
7	Marianne Vos (NED)	+ 1:12,4
8	Birgit Hollmann (GER)	+ 1:33,6
9	Helen Wyman (GBR)	+ 2:26,3
10	Linda Van Rijen (NED)	+ 2:42,1
11	Rhonda Mazza (USA)	+ 2:49,5
12	Loes Sels (BEL)	+ 3:01,8
13	Susanne Juranek (GER)	+ 3:17,8
14	Reza Hormes-Ravenstijn (NED)	+ 3:27,8
15	Kerry Barnholt (USA)	+ 3:36,1
16	Nadia Triquet-Claude (FRA)	+ 3:46,7
17	Stephanie Pohl (GER)	+ 3:56,0
18	Sanne Cant (BEL)	+ 4:11,0
19	Vania Rossi (ITA)	+ 4:14,4
20	Loes Gunnewijk (NED)	+ 4:14,6
21	Rosa Maria Bravo Soba (ESP)	+ 4:23,5
22	Milena Cavani (ITA)	+ 4:36,9
23	Caroline Mani (FRA)	+ 4:41,7
24	Gabriella Day (GBR)	+ 4:43,6
25	Ayako Toyooka (JPN)	+ 5:00,2
26	Veerle Ingels (BEL)	+ 5:09,4
27	Arenda Grimberg (NED)	+ 5:22,9
28	Claudia Seidel (GER)	+ 5:29,3
29	Tara Ross (CAN)	+ 5:34,4
30	Rocio Gamonal Ferrera (ESP)	+ 5:39,5
31	Alessandra Fatato (ITA)	+ 5:57,7
32	Deidre Winfield (USA)	+ 6:08,4
33	Christine Vardaros (USA)	+ 6:16,0
34	Francesca Cucciniello (ITA)	+ 6:32,4
35	Hilde Quintens (BEL)	+ 6:36,1
36	Daniela Bresciani (ITA)	+ 6:46,8
37	Ruth Moll Marques (ESP)	+ 6:50,8
38	Nicole Kampeter (GER)	+ 6:54,2
39	Katrien Pauwels (BEL)	+ 7:13,9
40	Mika Ogishima (JPN)	+ 7:43,9
41	Michiko Shimura (JPN)	+ 9:00,0
42	Ikumi Tajika (JPN)	+ 10:06,7
43	Tatjana Kaliakina (LTU)	
44	Kristina Strachovic (LTU)	

Dorota Warczyk from Poland abandoned the race.
