= Belgian National Cyclo-cross Championships =

Cyclo-cross national competition in Belgium

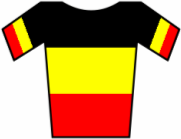
Belgium jersey

The Belgian National Cyclo-cross Championships were first held in 1910, and have been held annually since 1921 (with a break in 1940 due to World War II) by the Royal Belgian Cycling Federation (KBWB/RLVB). Races are run for elite men, elite women, under 23 men, junior (under 18) men, juvenile men, various masters (amateur over 30) categories and by other organisations catering for veteran riders.

== Elite men ==
Belgian National Cyclo-cross Championships – Men's elite race

Race details
- Date: Beginning of January
- Discipline: Cyclo-cross
- Type: One-day
- Organiser: Royal Belgian Cycling League

History
- First edition: 1910
- Editions: 109 (as of 2026)
- First winner: Philippe Thys
- Most wins: Roland Liboton (10 times)
- Most recent: Thibau Nys

The winners and placed riders for the professional men's event (literally "elite with contract"; a separate championship is still held for elite men without contract, following on from the earlier amateur event) each year have been:

Year	Location	Gold	Silver	Bronze
1910		Philippe Thys		
1911	not held			
1912		Joseph Van Ingelghem (1/2)		
1913		Henri Moerenhout (1/2)		
1914		Joseph Van Ingelghem (2/2)		
1915 to 1920	not held			
1921		René Vermandel		
1922		Maurice De Waele		
1923		Théodore Van Eetvelde		
1924		Joseph Van Dam		
1925		Pé Verhaegen		
1926		Henri Moerenhout (2/2)		
1927		Jean Meeuwis		
1928		Jules Goedhuys (1/2)		
1929		Georges Ronsse (1/2)		
1930		Georges Ronsse (2/2)		
1931		Jules Goedhuys (2/2)		
1932		Jef Demuysere		
1933		Maurice Seynaeve (1/5)		
1934		Maurice Seynaeve (2/5)		
1935		Maurice Seynaeve (3/5)		
1936		Maurice Seynaeve (4/5)		
1937		Maurice Seynaeve (5/5)		
1938		Omer Thys (1/2)		
1939		Omer Thys (2/2)		
1940	not held			
1941		Richard Blendeman		
1942		Eugeen Jacobs (1/2)		
1943		Eugeen Jacobs (2/2)		
1944		Frans Van Hellemont		
1945	Keerbergen	Georges Vandermeirsch (1/5)	Lode Michiels	Eugeen Jacobs
1946	Antwerp	Georges Vandermeirsch (2/5)	Lode Michiels	Oscar Goethals
1947	Wervik	Georges Vandermeirsch (3/5)	Lode Michiels	Odiel Vandenmeerschaut
1948	Heverlee	Frans De Coster	Odiel Vandenmeerschaut	Frans Loyaert
1949	Zingem	Georges Vandermeirsch (4/5)	Frans De Coster	Eugeen Jacobs
1950	Mater	Firmin Van Kerrebroeck (1/6)	Georges Vandermeirsch	Michel Decroix
1951	Westouter	Georges Vandermeirsch (5/5)	Firmin Van Kerrebroeck	Michel Decroix
1952	Hoeselt	Firmin Van Kerrebroeck (2/6)	Frans Feremans	René De Keyser
1953	Lens	Georges Furnière	Roger De Clercq	Firmin Van Kerrebroeck
1954	Hombeek	Frans Feremans	Roger De Clercq	Charles Van Houtte
1955	Sombreffe	Firmin Van Kerrebroeck (3/6)	Roger De Clercq	Charles Van Houtte
1956	Edelare	Firmin Van Kerrebroeck (4/6)	Roger De Clercq	Calixte Van Steenbrugge
1957	Budingen	René De Rey (1/2)	Georges Furnière	Roger De Clercq
1958	Meulebeke	Firmin Van Kerrebroeck (5/6)	Roger De Clercq	Hendrik Willems
1959	Hoeselt	René De Rey (2/2)	Firmin Van Kerrebroeck	Hendrik Willems
1960	Everbeek	Roger De Clercq (1/3)	Firmin Van Kerrebroeck	Pierre Kumps
1961	Hombeek	Firmin Van Kerrebroeck (6/6)	Herman Van Caester	Pierre Kumps
1962	Vonêche	Roger De Clercq (2/3)	Albert Van Damme	Pierre Kumps
1963	Gavere	Albert Van Damme (1/6)	Jozef Matheussen	Pierre Kumps
1964	Bomal	Roger De Clercq (3/3)	René De Rey	Albert Van Damme
1965	Overijse	Albert Van Damme (2/6)	Pierre Kumps	Leon Scheirs
1966	Meulebeke	Albert Van Damme (3/6)	René De Rey	Robert Vermeire
1967	Zolder	Erik De Vlaeminck (1/4)	Freddy Nys	René De Clercq
1968	Opwijk	Albert Van Damme (4/6)	Roger De Vlaeminck	Herman Van Caester
1969	Ruien	Erik De Vlaeminck (2/4)	Julien Van Den Haesevelde	Freddy Nys
1970	Wetteren	Albert Van Damme (5/6)	Roger De Vlaeminck	Daniel Van Damme
1971	Ruien	Erik De Vlaeminck (3/4)	Albert Van Damme	René De Clercq
1972	Lembeek	Erik De Vlaeminck (4/4)	Albert Van Damme	Michel Baele
1973	Horebeke	Albert Van Damme (6/6)	Michel Baele	Julien Van Den Haesevelde
1974	Beernem	Roger De Vlaeminck (1/3)	Albert Van Damme	Michel Baele
1975	Volkegem	Roger De Vlaeminck (2/3)	Erik De Vlaeminck	Marc De Block
1976	Overijse	Marc De Block (1/2)	Albert Van Damme	Erik De Vlaeminck
1977	Munte	Marc De Block (2/2)	Albert Van Damme	Erik De Vlaeminck
1978	Beernem	Roger De Vlaeminck (3/3)	Eric Desruelle	Jan Teugels
1979	Koersel	Jan Teugels	Roger De Vlaeminck	Robert Vermeire
1980	Maurage	Roland Liboton (1/10)	Robert Vermeire	Johan Ghyllebert
1981	Vaux-sous-Chèvremont	Roland Liboton (2/10)	Robert Vermeire	Johan Ghyllebert
1982	Kessel	Roland Liboton (3/10)	Robert Vermeire	Johan Ghyllebert
1983	Overijse	Roland Liboton (4/10)	Robert Vermeire	Johan Ghyllebert
1984	Asper	Roland Liboton (5/10)	Robert Vermeire	Johan Ghyllebert
1985	Zillebeke	Roland Liboton (6/10)	Rudy De Bie	Robert Vermeire
1986	Koersel	Roland Liboton (7/10)	Paul De Brauwer	Rudy De Bie
1987	Mol	Roland Liboton (8/10)	Paul De Brauwer	Yvan Messelis
1988	Ploegsteert	Roland Liboton (9/10)	Paul De Brauwer	Danny De Bie
1989	Bioul	Roland Liboton (10/10)	Yvan Messelis	Danny De Bie
1990	Overijse	Danny De Bie (1/3)	Roland Liboton	Yvan Messelis
1991	Asper	Danny De Bie (2/3)	Paul De Brauwer	Johan Museeuw
1992	Diksmuide	Danny De Bie (3/3)	Guy Vandijck	Paul De Brauwer
1993	Houthalen	Paul Herygers (1/2)	Danny De Bie	Paul De Brauwer
1994	Soumagne	Peter Van Den Abeele	Danny De Bie	Filip Van Luchem
1995	Heist-op-den-Berg	Marc Janssens (1/3)	Erwin Vervecken	Peter Van den Abeele
1996	Overijse	Erwin Vervecken	Paul Herygers	Mario De Clercq
1997	Hoogstraten	Paul Herygers (2/2)	Mario De Clercq	Arne Daelmans
1998	Geraardsbergen	Marc Janssens (2/3)	Erwin Vervecken	Mario De Clercq
1999	Soumagne	Marc Janssens (3/3)	Mario De Clercq	Sven Nys
2000	Ghent	Sven Nys (1/9)	Erwin Vervecken	Mario De Clercq
2001	Mol	Mario De Clercq (1/2)	Erwin Vervecken	Bart Wellens
2002	Koksijde	Mario De Clercq (2/2)	Erwin Vervecken	Sven Vanthourenhout
2003	Wielsbeke	Sven Nys (2/9)	Ben Berden	Bart Wellens
2004	Lille	Bart Wellens (1/2)	Mario De Clercq	Sven Nys
2005	Wachtebeke	Sven Nys (3/9)	Tom Vannoppen	Ben Berden
2006	Tervuren	Sven Nys (4/9)	Erwin Vervecken	Bart Wellens
2007	Hamme	Bart Wellens (2/2)	Klaas Vantornout	Sven Nys
2008	Hofstade	Sven Nys (5/9)	Bart Wellens	Niels Albert
2009	Ruddervoorde	Sven Nys (6/9)	Niels Albert	Kevin Pauwels
2010	Oostmalle	Sven Nys (7/9)	Klaas Vantornout	Tom Meeusen
2011	Antwerp	Niels Albert	Bart Wellens	Kevin Pauwels
2012	Hooglede-Gits	Sven Nys (8/9)	Niels Albert	Rob Peeters
2013	Mol	Klaas Vantornout (1/2)	Sven Nys	Kevin Pauwels
2014	Waregem	Sven Nys (9/9)	Rob Peeters	Bart Wellens
2015	Erpe-Mere	Klaas Vantornout (2/2)	Tom Meeusen	Wout van Aert
2016	Lille	Wout van Aert (1/5)	Laurens Sweeck	Sven Nys
2017	Ostend	Wout van Aert (2/5)	Kevin Pauwels	Laurens Sweeck
2018	Koksijde	Wout van Aert (3/5)	Laurens Sweeck	Daan Soete
2019	Kruibeke	Toon Aerts	Wout van Aert	Michael Vanthourenhout
2020	Antwerp	Laurens Sweeck	Eli Iserbyt	Toon Aerts
2021	Meulebeke	Wout van Aert (4/5)	Toon Aerts	Michael Vanthourenhout
2022	Middelkerke	Wout van Aert (5/5)	Laurens Sweeck	Quinten Hermans
2023	Lokeren	Michael Vanthourenhout	Laurens Sweeck	Thibau Nys
2024	Meulebeke	Eli Iserbyt	Joran Wyseure	Michael Vanthourenhout
2025	Zolder	Thibau Nys	Laurens Sweeck	Toon Aerts
2026	Beringen	Thibau Nys	Emiel Verstrynge	Michael Vanthourenhout

=== Multiple winners ===
Riders in italics are still active.

Amount	Rider
10	Roland Liboton
9	Sven Nys
6	Albert Van Damme
6	Firmin Van Kerrebroeck
5	Maurice Seynaeve
5	Georges Vandermeirsch
5	Wout van Aert
4	Erik De Vlaeminck
3	Danny De Bie
3	Roger De Clercq
3	Roger De Vlaeminck
3	Marc Janssens
2	Marc De Block
2	Mario De Clercq
2	René De Rey
2	Paul Herygers
2	Eugeen Jacobs
2	Henri Moerenhout
2	Thibau Nys
2	Georges Ronsse
2	Omer Thys
2	Joseph Van Ingelghem
2	Klaas Vantornout
2	Bart Wellens

== Elite women ==
Belgian National Cyclo-cross Championships – Women's elite race
Race details
- Date: Beginning of January
- Discipline: Cyclo-cross
- Type: One-day
- Organiser: Royal Belgian Cycling League

History
- First edition: 2001
- Editions: 26 (as of 2026)
- First winner: Kathleen Vermeiren
- Most wins: Sanne Cant (15 times)
- Most recent: Marion Norbert-Riberolle

Year	Gold	Silver	Bronze
2001	Kathleen Vermeiren	Anja Nobus	Lory Laroy
2002	Anja Nobus (1/2)	Kathleen Vermeiren	Hilde Quintens
2003	Hilde Quintens (1/2)	Anja Nobus	Veerle Ingels
2004	Anja Nobus (2/2)	Loes Sels	Kathleen Vermeiren
2005	Veerle Ingels	Anja Nobus	Loes Sels
2006	Hilde Quintens (2/2)	Kathy Ingels	Anja Nobus
2007	Loes Sels (1/2)	Katrien Aerts	Hilde Quintens
2008	Loes Sels (2/2)	Veerle Ingels	Katrien Pauwels
2009	Joyce Vanderbeken	Sanne Cant	Veerle Ingels
2010	Sanne Cant (1/15)	Joyce Vanderbeken	Ellen Van Loy
2011	Sanne Cant (2/15)	Nancy Bober	Joyce Vanderbeken
2012	Sanne Cant (3/15)	Joyce Vanderbeken	Hilde Quintens
2013	Sanne Cant (4/15)	Ellen Van Loy	Joyce Vanderbeken
2014	Sanne Cant (5/15)	Ellen Van Loy	Githa Michiels
2015	Sanne Cant (6/15)	Ellen Van Loy	Githa Michiels
2016	Sanne Cant (7/15)	Ellen Van Loy	Loes Sels
2017	Sanne Cant (8/15)	Laura Verdonschot	Ellen Van Loy
2018	Sanne Cant (9/15)	Ellen Van Loy	Loes Sels
2019	Sanne Cant (10/15)	Loes Sels	Laura Verdonschot
2020	Sanne Cant (11/15)	Laura Verdonschot	Ellen Van Loy
2021	Sanne Cant (12/15)	Lotte Kopecky	Alicia Franck
2022	Sanne Cant (13/15)	Marion Norbert-Riberolle	Laura Verdonschot
2023	Sanne Cant (14/15)	Marion Norbert-Riberolle	Alicia Franck
2024	Sanne Cant (15/15)	Laura Verdonschot	Marion Norbert-Riberolle
2025	Marion Norbert-Riberolle (1/2)	Laura Verdonschot	Julie Brouwers
2026	Marion Norbert-Riberolle (2/2)	Fleur Moors	Kiona Crabbé

=== Multiple winners ===
Riders in italics are still active.

Amount	Rider
15	Sanne Cant
2	Anja Nobus
2	Marion Norbert-Riberolle
2	Hilde Quintens
2	Loes Sels
