= 2006–07 Cyclo-cross Gazet van Antwerpen =

The Gazet van Antwerpen Trophy Cyclo cross 2006–2007 started November 1 with de Koppenbergcross and ended February 18 with Sluitingsprijs Oostmalle.

== Men results ==
Date	Venue	Winner	Second	Third
1 November	(Belgium) Oudenaarde	(Belgium) Sven Nys	(Netherlands) Richard Groenendaal	(France) John Gadret
11 November	(Belgium) Niel	(Belgium) Bart Wellens	(Netherlands) Richard Groenendaal	(Belgium) Sven Nys
18 November	(Belgium) Hasselt	(Netherlands) Gerben De Knegt	(Belgium) Bart Wellens	(Belgium) Sven Nys
16 December	(Belgium) Essen	(Belgium) Sven Nys	(Belgium) Bart Wellens	(Netherlands) Gerben De Knegt
28 December	(Belgium) Loenhout	(Belgium) Niels Albert	(Belgium) Sven Nys	(Belgium) Erwin Vervecken
1 January	(Belgium) Baal	(Belgium) Sven Nys	(Netherlands) Lars Boom	(Belgium) Niels Albert
3 February	(Belgium) Lille	(Belgium) Sven Nys	(Netherlands) Richard Groenendaal	(Netherlands) Gerben De Knegt
18 February	(Belgium) Oostmalle	(Belgium) Niels Albert	(Belgium) Sven Nys	(United States) Jonathan Page

=== Ranking (top 10) ===
Nr.	Name	Nation	Points
1	Sven Nys	Belgium	273
2	Niels Albert	Belgium	238
3	Richard Groenendaal	Netherlands	220
4	Gerben De Knegt	Netherlands	210
5	Erwin Vervecken	Belgium	195
6	Bart Wellens	Belgium	184
7	Sven Vanthourenhout	Belgium	181
8	Zdenek Stybar	Czech Republic	181
9	Bart Aernouts	Belgium	142
10	Wilant van Gils	Belgium	135

== Women results ==
Date	Venue	Winner	Second	Third
1 November	(Belgium) Oudenaarde	(Netherlands) Marianne Vos	(Netherlands) Reza Hormes-Ravenstijn	(Netherlands) Daphny van den Brand
28 December	(Belgium) Loenhout	(Germany) Hanka Kupfernagel	(Netherlands) Daphny van den Brand	(Netherlands) Marianne Vos
3 February	(Belgium) Lille	(Netherlands) Reza Hormes-Ravenstijn	(Belgium) Loes Sels	(Belgium) Sanne Cant
18 February	(Belgium) Oostmalle	(Netherlands) Marianne Vos	(Germany) Reza Hormes-Ravenstijn	(Belgium) Loes Sels

== See also ==
- 2006/07 UCI Cyclo-cross World Cup
- 2006/07 Cyclo-cross Superprestige
- Cyclo-cross Gazet van Antwerpen
