= 2006–07 Cyclo-cross Superprestige =

Details
- Dates: 15 October 2006 – 17 February 2007
- Location: Belgium and Netherlands
- Races: 8

Champions
- Male individual champion: Sven Nys (BEL)

The 2006–07 Superprestige took place between 15 October 2006 and 17 February 2007.

== Men results ==
Date	Venue	Winner	Second	Third
15 October	(Belgium) Ruddervoorde	(Belgium) Sven Nys	(Belgium) Sven Vanthourenhout	(Belgium) Bart Wellens
29 October	(Netherlands) Sint Michielsgestel	(Belgium) Sven Nys	(Belgium) Kevin Pauwels	(Netherlands) Richard Groenendaal
19 November	(Belgium) Asper-Gavere	(Belgium) Sven Nys	(Belgium) Erwin Vervecken	(France) John Gadret
26 November	(Netherlands) Gieten	(Belgium) Sven Nys	(Netherlands) Gerben de Knegt	(Belgium) Klaas Vantornout
10 December	(Belgium) Hamme-Zogge	(Belgium) Sven Nys	(Belgium) Bart Wellens	(Belgium) Erwin Vervecken
31 December	(Belgium) Diegem	(Belgium) Sven Nys	(Belgium) Bart Wellens	(Belgium) Kevin Pauwels
4 February	(Belgium) Hoogstraten	(Belgium) Sven Nys	(Netherlands) Richard Groenendaal	(Netherlands) Gerben de Knegt
17 February	(Belgium) Vorselaar	(Belgium) Sven Nys	(Belgium) Klaas Vantornout	(Belgium) Erwin Vervecken

=== Men rankings ===
The top 15 riders in every race score points, descending from 15 points for the winner to 1 point for number fifteen. The exceptions were Asper-Gavere and Diegem, where the points were doubled: 30 for first, 28 for second and so on to 2 points for number 15.

Rank	Cyclist	Points
1	Sven Nys (BEL)	150
2	Erwin Vervecken (BEL)	110
3	Bart Wellens (BEL)	103
4	Sven Vanthourenhout (BEL)	99
5	Gerben de Knegt (NED)	95
6	Richard Groenendaal (NED)	86
7	Klaas Vantornout (BEL)	71
8	Kevin Pauwels (BEL)	65
9	Petr Dlask (CZE)	58
10	John Gadret (FRA)	44
11	Thijs Al (NED)	40
12	Radomír Šimůnek, Jr. (CZE)	31
13	Wilant van Gils (NED)	30
14	Jonathan Page (USA)	29
15	Davy Commeyne (BEL)	28
16	Jan Soetens (BEL)	22
17	Kamil Ausbuher (CZE)	21
18	Francis Mourey (FRA)	20
19	Maarten Nijland (NED)	17
20	Maxime Lefebvre (FRA)	14
21	Bart Aernouts (BEL)	12
22	Christian Heule (SUI)	11
23	David Willemsens (BEL)	9
24	Jan Verstraeten (BEL)	8
25	Ryan Trebon (USA)	6
=	Tim Van Nuffel (BEL)	6
27	Peter Van Santvliet (BEL)	4
28	Wim Jacobs (BEL)	3
=	Marco Bianco (ITA)	3
30	Enrico Franzoi (ITA)	2
=	Arne Daelmans (BEL)	2
32	Cyrille Bonnand (FRA)	1

== Women results ==
Date	Venue	Winner	Second	Third
29 October	(Netherlands) Sint-Michielsgestel	(Netherlands) Arenda Grimberg	(Belgium) Sanne Cant	(Belgium) Anja Nobus
19 November	(Belgium) Asper-Gavere	(Belgium) Hilde Quintens	(Netherlands) Reza Hormes-Ravenstijn	(Belgium) Veerle Ingels
26 November	(Netherlands) Gieten	(Netherlands) Marianne Vos	(Netherlands) Reza Hormes-Ravenstijn	(Germany) Susanne Juranek

== See also ==
- 2006/07 UCI Cyclo-cross World Cup
- 2006/07 Cyclo-cross Gazet van Antwerpen
