= Sluitingsprijs Oostmalle =

Cyclo-cross race in Oostmalle, Belgium

Internationale Sluitingsprijs Oostmalle

Race details
- Date: February
- Region: Oostmalle, Belgium
- English name: International [Season-]Closing Prize of Oostmalle
- Discipline: Cyclo-cross
- Competition: stand-alone
- Type: one-day
- Organiser: Wieler Supporters Club Oostmalle
- Web site: www.cyclocross-oostmalle.be

History (men)
- First edition: 1995
- Editions: 32 (as of 2026)
- First winner: Paul Herygers (BEL)
- Most wins: Niels Albert (BEL) (6 wins)
- Most recent: Niels Vandeputte (BEL)

History (women)
- First edition: 2001
- Editions: 25 (as of 2026)
- First winner: Daphny van den Brand (NED)
- Most wins: Daphny van den Brand (NED) (7 wins)
- Most recent: Inge van der Heijden (NED)

The Internationale Sluitingsprijs Oostmalle is a cyclo-cross race held in Oostmalle, Belgium, which was part of the Cyclo-cross Trophy until 2014. Since the 2014-2015 season it became an independent race but still with the back-up from the UCI. It is traditionally the last important race of the cyclo-cross season. The race is held in the woods of Christophe Lenaerts and the military airfield.

== Podiums ==
=== Men ===
Year	Winner	2nd	3rd
2026	Niels Vandeputte (BEL)	Yordi Corsus (BEL)	Joris Nieuwenhuis (NED)
2025	Joris Nieuwenhuis (NED)	Laurens Sweeck (BEL)	Toon Vandebosch (BEL)
2024	Niels Vandeputte (BEL)	Lars van der Haar (NED)	Eli Iserbyt (BEL)
2023	Laurens Sweeck (BEL)	Lars van der Haar (NED)	Niels Vandeputte (BEL)
2022	Laurens Sweeck (BEL)	Jens Adams (BEL)	Thibau Nys (BEL)
2021	Laurens Sweeck (BEL)	Quinten Hermans (BEL)	Lars van der Haar (NED)
2020	Laurens Sweeck (BEL)	Toon Aerts (BEL)	Michael Vanthourenhout (BEL)
2019	Kevin Pauwels (BEL)	Toon Aerts (BEL)	Tom Meeusen (BEL)
2018	Mathieu van der Poel (NED)	Laurens Sweeck (BEL)	David van der Poel (NED)
2017	Wout van Aert (BEL)	Mathieu van der Poel (NED)	Tom Meeusen (BEL)
2016	Kevin Pauwels (BEL)	Wout van Aert (BEL)	Tom Meeusen (BEL)
2015	Wout van Aert (BEL)	Kevin Pauwels (BEL)	Laurens Sweeck (BEL)
2014	Niels Albert (BEL)	Tom Meeusen (BEL)	Kevin Pauwels (BEL)
2013	Niels Albert (BEL)	Klaas Vantornout (BEL)	Jim Aernouts (BEL)
2012	Niels Albert (BEL)	Zdeněk Štybar (CZE)	Kevin Pauwels (BEL)
2011	Niels Albert (BEL)	Zdeněk Štybar (CZE)	Bart Aernouts (BEL)
2010	Bart Wellens (BEL)	Zdeněk Štybar (CZE)	Kevin Pauwels (BEL)
2009	Sven Nys (BEL)	Niels Albert (BEL)	Sven Vanthourenhout (BEL)
2008	Niels Albert (BEL)	Bart Wellens (BEL)	Lars Boom (NED)
2007	Niels Albert (BEL)	Sven Nys (BEL)	Jonathan Page (USA)
2006	Gerben De Knegt (NED)	Sven Nys (BEL)	Erwin Vervecken (BEL)
2005	Sven Nys (BEL)	Davy Commeyne (BEL)	Sven Vanthourenhout (BEL)
2004	Richard Groenendaal (NED)	Mario De Clerq (BEL)	Sven Vanthourenhout (BEL)
2003	Ben Berden (BEL)	Bart Wellens (BEL)	Arne Daelmans (BEL)
2002	Arne Daelmans (BEL)	Wim Jacobs (BEL)	Mario De Clerq (BEL)
2001	Bart Wellens (BEL)	Erwin Vervecken (BEL)	Sven Vanthourenhout (BEL)
2000	Arne Daelmans (BEL)	Bart Wellens (BEL)	Kipcho Volckaerts (BEL)
1999	Sven Nys (BEL)	Arne Daelmans (BEL)	Erwin Vervecken (BEL)
1998	Arne Daelmans (BEL)	Peter Willemsens (BEL)	Alex Moonen (BEL)
1997	Paul Herygers (BEL)	Peter Willemsens (BEL)	Arne Daelmans (BEL)
1996	Paul Herygers (BEL)	Arne Daelmans (BEL)	Peter Willemsens (BEL)
1995	Paul Herygers (BEL)	Richard Groenendaal (NED)	Arne Daelmans (BEL)

=== Women ===
Year	Winner	2nd	3rd
2026	Inge van der Heijden (NED)	Ceylin del Carmen Alvarado (NED)	Marion Norbert-Riberolle (BEL)
2025	Lucinda Brand (NED)	Inge van der Heijden (NED)	Hélène Clauzel (FRA)
2024	Lucinda Brand (NED)	Laura Verdonschot (BEL)	Manon Bakker (NED)
2023	Annemarie Worst (NED)	Manon Bakker (NED)	Denise Betsema (NED)
2022	Annemarie Worst (NED)	Denise Betsema (NED)	Lucinda Brand (NED)
2021	Denise Betsema (NED)	Sanne Cant (BEL)	Inge van der Heijden (NED)
2020	Annemarie Worst (NED)	Denise Betsema (NED)	Inge van der Heijden (NED)
2019	~~Denise Betsema (NED)~~	Annemarie Worst (NED)	Loes Sels (BEL)
2018	Loes Sels (BEL)	Maud Kaptheijns (NED)	Annemarie Worst (NED)
2017	Sanne Cant (BEL)	Laura Verdonschot (BEL)	Maud Kaptheijns (NED)
2016	Sanne Cant (BEL)	Loes Sels (BEL)	Maud Kaptheijns (NED)
2015	Sanne Cant (BEL)	Nikki Brammeier (GBR)	Loes Sels (BEL)
2014	Sanne Cant (BEL)	Loes Sels (BEL)	Helen Wyman (GBR)
2013	Sanne Cant (BEL)	Sabrina Stultiens (NED)	Helen Wyman (GBR)
2012	Daphny van den Brand (NED)	Marianne Vos (NED)	Sanne van Paassen (NED)
2011	Daphny van den Brand (NED)	Sanne Cant (BEL)	Helen Wyman (GBR)
2010	Marianne Vos (NED)	Daphny van den Brand (NED)	Sanne Cant (BEL)
2009	Marianne Vos (NED)	Daphny van den Brand (NED)	Sanne Cant (BEL)
2008	Daphny van den Brand (NED)	Saskia Elemans (NED)	Sanne Cant (BEL)
2007	Marianne Vos (NED)	Reza Hormes-Ravenstijn (NED)	Loes Sels (BEL)
2006	Daphny van den Brand (NED)	Marianne Vos (NED)	Hanka Kupfernagel (GER)
2005	Hanka Kupfernagel (GER)	Marianne Vos (NED)	Daphny van den Brand (NED)
2004	Daphny van den Brand (NED)	Marianne Vos (NED)	Anja Nobus (BEL)
2003	Daphny van den Brand (NED)	Reza Hormes-Ravenstijn (NED)	Anja Nobus (BEL)
2002	not held		
2001	Daphny van den Brand (NED)	Reza Hormes-Ravenstijn (NED)	Louise Robinson (GBR)
