= 2000 UCI Cyclo-cross World Championships =

Cycling competition

- Venue: Sint-Michielsgestel, the Netherlands
- Date: January 28–29, 2000
- Coordinates: 51°38′N 5°21′E
- Events: 4

The 2000 UCI Cyclo-cross World Championships were held in Sint-Michielsgestel, Netherlands on Saturday January 28 and Sunday January 29, 2000. This was the first year that a women's event was held. The track for the race was 2660 meter long with 700 meter road, 1080 meter grass and 880 meter forest trail.

== Schedule ==
- Saturday January 29, 2000
  - 11:00 Women's Elite
  - 14:00 Men's Under 23
- Sunday January 30, 2000
  - 11:00 Men's Juniors
  - 14:00 Men's Elite

== Medal summary ==
| Event | Gold | | Silver | | Bronze | |
|---|---|---|---|---|---|---|
Men's events
| Men's elite race | Richard Groenendaal (NED) | 59' 57" | Mario De Clercq (BEL) | + 38" | Sven Nys (BEL) | + 42" |
| Men's under-23 race | Bart Wellens (BEL) | 53' 32" | Tom Vannoppen (BEL) | + 44" | Davy Commeyne (BEL) | + 1' 04" |
| Men's junior race | Bart Aernouts (BEL) | 41' 06" | Walker Ferguson (USA) | + 15" | David Kasek (CZE) | + 47" |
Women's events
| Women's elite race | Hanka Kupfernagel (GER) | 42' 10" | Louise Robinson (GBR) | + 57" | Daphny van den Brand (NED) | + 1' 16" |

== Medal table ==
| Rank | Nation | Gold | Silver | Bronze | Total |
|---|---|---|---|---|---|
| 1 | Belgium (BEL) | 2 | 2 | 2 | 6 |
| 2 | Netherlands (NED) | 1 | 0 | 1 | 2 |
| 3 | Germany (GER) | 1 | 0 | 0 | 1 |
| 4 | Great Britain (GBR) | 0 | 1 | 0 | 1 |
| 4 | United States (USA) | 0 | 1 | 0 | 1 |
| 6 | Czech Republic (CZE) | 0 | 0 | 1 | 1 |
| Totals (6 entries) | | 4 | 4 | 4 | 12 |

== Men's Elite ==
- Held on Sunday January 29, 2000

| RANK | 2000 UCI CYCLO-CROSS WORLD CHAMPIONSHIPS | TIME |
|---|---|---|
| 1. Gold medal | Richard Groenendaal (NED) | 00:59:57 |
| 2. Silver medal | Mario De Clercq (BEL) | + 0.38 |
| 3. Bronze medal | Sven Nys (BEL) | + 0.42 |
| 4. | Adrie van der Poel (NED) | + 1.18 |
| 5. | Wim de Vos (NED) | + 1.50 |
| 6. | Ben Berden (BEL) | + 2.08 |
| 7. | Peter van Santvliet (BEL) | + 2.12 |
| 8. | Gerben de Knegt (NED) | + 2.17 |
| 9. | Daniele Pontoni (ITA) | + 2.22 |
| 10. | Dominique Arnould (FRA) | + 2.23 |

== Women's Elite ==
- Held on Sunday January 29, 2000

| RANK | 2002 UCI CYCLO-CROSS WORLD CHAMPIONSHIPS | TIME |
|---|---|---|
| 1. Gold medal | Hanka Kupfernagel (GER) | 00:42:10 |
| 2. Silver medal | Louise Robinson (GBR) | + 0:57 |
| 3. Bronze medal | Daphny van den Brand (NED) | + 1:16 |
| 4. | Laurence Leboucher (FRA) | + 2:03 |
| 5. | Alison Dunlap (USA) | + 2:30 |
| 6. | Corine Dorland (NED) | + 2:55 |
| 7. | Alla Yepifanova (RUS) | + 3:14 |
| 8. | Carmen Richardson (USA) | + 3:15 |
| 9. | Inge Velthuis (NED) | + 3:36 |
| 10. | Chantal Daucourt (SUI) | + 3:57 |
