= 2012 UCI Cyclo-cross World Championships – Women's elite race =

Women's Elite Cyclo-cross Race
2012 UCI Cyclo-cross World Championships
- Rainbow jersey

Race details
- Dates: January 29, 2012
- Stages: 1
- Distance: 14.79 km (9.19 mi)
- Winning time: 41' 04"

Medalists
	Gold	Marianne Vos (Netherlands)
	Silver	Daphny Van Den Brand (Netherlands)
	Bronze	Sanne Cant (Belgium)

This event was held on Sunday 29 January 2012 as part of the UCI Cyclo-cross World Championships in Koksijde, Belgium. Five laps had to be completed, totalling up to 14.79 kilometre. It was won by Marianne Vos of Netherlands who was first and in control from start to finish. In the background Sanne Cant of Belgium, quite adapt in the sand, tried to get rid of Daphny Van Den Brand of Netherlands in the many sand patches, but never managed to. Van Den Brand eventually beat Cant in the sprint, taking home the silver.

== Ranking ==
Rank	Cyclist	Time
Gold medal	Marianne Vos (NED)	41' 04"
Silver medal	Daphny Van Den Brand (NED)	+ 37"
Bronze medal	Sanne Cant (BEL)	+ 38"
4	Sanne Van Paassen (NED)	+ 49"
5	Katie Compton (USA)	+ 53"
6	Nikki Harris (GBR)	+ 1'03"
7	Sophie de Boer (NED)	+ 1'05"
8	Kateřina Nash (CZE)	+ 1'11"
9	Jasmin Achermann (SUI)	+ 1'12"
10	Lucie Chainel-Lefèvre (FRA)	+ 1'54"
11	Pavla Havliková (CZE)	+ 2'43"
12	Sabrina Stultiens (NED)	+ 2'43"
13	Helen Wyman (GBR)	+ 2'45"
14	Christine Majerus (LUX)	+ 2'46"
15	Linda Van Rijen (NED)	+ 2'52"
16	Arenda Grimberg (NED)	+ 3'01"
17	Gesa Bruchmann (GER)	+ 3'30"
18	Caroline Mani (FRA)	+ 3'36"
19	Nicole Duke (USA)	+ 3'40"
20	Meredith Miller (USA)	+ 3'54"
21	Olga Wasiuk (POL)	+ 4'52"
22	Martina Mikulaskova (CZE)	+ 5'04"
23	Amy Dombroski (USA)	+ 5'21"
24	Joyce Vanderbeken (BEL)	+ 5'34"
25	Kajsa Snihs (SWE)	+ 5'39"
26	Kaitlin Antonneau (USA)	+ 5'41"
27	Rocio Ferrera Gamonal (ESP)	+ 5'43"
28	Sabrina Maurer (SUI)	+ 5'56"
29	Nikoline Hansen (DEN)	+ 6'19"
30	Asa Erlandsson (SWE)	+ 6'34"
31	Alice Maria Arzuffi (ITA)	+ 6'55"
32	Ayako Toyooka (JPN)	– 1 LAP
33	Sakiko Miyauchi (JPN)	– 1 LAP
34	Lise-Marie Henzelin (SUI)	– 1 LAP
35	Genevieve Whitson (NZL)	– 2 LAPS
36	Madara Furmane (LVA)	– 2 LAPS
