= Vardaro =

Vardaro is a surname. Notable people with the surname include:

- Bobby Vardaro (born 1991), American football player
- Christine Vardaros (born 1969), American cyclist
- Elvino Vardaro (1905–1971), Argentine tango composer and violinist
