= Centrumcross Surhuisterveen =

The Centrumcross Surhuisterveen is a cyclo-cross race held in Surhuisterveen, Netherlands.

== Past winners ==
Year	Men's winner	Women's winner
2017	(Netherlands) Corné van Kessel	(Netherlands) Marianne Vos
2016	(Netherlands) Corné van Kessel	(Netherlands) Anna van der Breggen
2015	(Netherlands) Lars van der Haar	(Netherlands) Marianne Vos
2014	(Netherlands) Lars van der Haar	(Netherlands) Marianne Vos
2013	(Belgium) Rob Peeters	(Netherlands) Marianne Vos
2012	not held	not held
2011	(Netherlands) Gerben De Knegt	(Netherlands) Marianne Vos
2010	not held	not held
2009	(Netherlands) Lars Boom	(Netherlands) Saskia Elemans
2008	(Belgium) Sven Nys	(Netherlands) Saskia Elemans
2007	(Netherlands) Richard Groenendaal	(Germany) Nicole Kampeter
2006	(Netherlands) Richard Groenendaal	(Netherlands) Arenda Grimberg
2005	(Netherlands) Richard Groenendaal	(Netherlands) Reza Hormes-Ravenstijn
2004	(Belgium) Bart Wellens	(Netherlands) Marianne Vos
2003	(Belgium) Mario De Clercq	(Netherlands) Marianne Vos
2002	(Netherlands) Gerben de Knegt	(Netherlands) Debby Mansfeld
2001	not held	not held
2000	(Belgium) Erwin Vervecken	(Netherlands) Inge Velthuis
1999	(Belgium) Sven Nys	(Netherlands) Corine Dorland
1998	(Belgium) Mario De Clercq	(Netherlands) Inge Velthuis
1997	(Belgium) Paul Herijgers	(Netherlands) Inge Velthuis
1996	(Netherlands) Adrie van der Poel	not held
1995	(Netherlands) Adrie van der Poel	not held
