= 2007 in cycle racing =

2007 in cycle racing may refer to:

- 2007 in men's road cycling
- 2007 in women's road cycling
- 2007 in men's cyclo-cross
- 2007 in women's cyclo-cross
- 2007 in track cycling

== See also ==
- 2007 in sports
