= 2007 in cyclo-cross =

2007 in cyclo-cross may refer to:

- 2007 in men's cyclo-cross
- 2007 in women's cyclo-cross
