= Roger De Clercq =

Personal information
- Born: 2 September 1930 Nederzwalm-Hermelgem, Zwalm, Belgium
- Died: 24 August 2014 (aged 83) Aalst, Belgium

Cycling career
- Sport: Cycling
- Disciplines: Cyclo-cross; Road
- Role: Rider

Professional teams
- 1954: Groene Leeuw–Huret
- 1955–1956: Plume–Vainqueur
- 1957: Elvé–Marvan
- 1958: Plume–Vainqueur
- 1959–1968: Groene Leeuw–Sinalco–SAS

Major wins
- Cyclo-cross National Championships (1960, 1962, 1964)
Medal record
Men's cyclo-cross
Representing Belgium
World Championships
Silver medal – second place	1964 Overboelare	Elite race

Roger De Clercq (2 September 1930 – 24 August 2014) was a Belgian racing cyclist. Professional from 1954 to 1968, he won 68 races in his career; including the Belgian National Cyclo-cross Championships three times, in 1960, 1962 and 1964, and a silver medal at the 1964 UCI Cyclo-cross World Championships. He was the brother of René De Clercq and the uncle of Mario De Clercq, also professional cyclists.

== Major results ==
=== Cyclo-cross ===
1953
2nd National Championships
10th UCI World Championships
1954
2nd National Championships
7th UCI World Championships
1955
2nd National Championships
1956
2nd National Championships
1957
3rd National Championships
10th UCI World Championships
1958
2nd National Championships
1959
1st Noordzeecross
1st Zonhoven
1960
1st National Championships
8th UCI World Championships
1961
5th UCI World Championships
1962
1st National Championships
1st Zonhoven
4th UCI World Championships
1963
5th UCI World Championships
1964
1st National Championships
2nd UCI World Championships
1965
1st Noordzeecross
4th UCI World Championships

=== Road ===
1954
1st Petegem-aan-de-Leie
1st Stage 8 Route de France
1955
2nd Petegem-aan-de-Leie
1956
2nd Nokere Koerse
1958
10th Elfstedenronde
