= 2019 UCI Cyclo-cross World Championships – Women's elite race =

Women's elite race
2019 UCI Cyclo-cross World Championships
- Rainbow jersey

Race details
- Dates: 2 February 2019
- Stages: 1
- Distance: 18.35 km (11.40 mi)
- Winning time: 47' 53"

Medalists
	Gold	Sanne Cant (Belgium)
	Silver	Lucinda Brand (Netherlands)
	Bronze	Marianne Vos (Netherlands)

This event was held on 2 February 2019 as a part of the 2019 UCI Cyclo-cross World Championships in Bogense, Denmark. Participants must be women born in 2002 or before. The race was won by Sanne Cant of Belgium, winning her third consecutive title.

== Race report ==
Dutch trio Denise Betsema, Marianne Vos and Annemarie Worst took the fastest start, leading after one lap with only defending champion Sanne Cant and her Belgian compatriot Ellen Van Loy able to follow. Lucinda Brand, who was tipped as big favorite prior to the race, was following in a second group some ten seconds behind, flanked by Jolanda Neff, Kaitlin Keough and Nikki Brammeier.

Together with Neff, Brand was able to close the gap to the leading group, where Van Loy had been dropped following a fall on one of the steeper slopes. Although slippery in some parts, overall the race was relatively straightforward, with long straight parts beside the windy coast of Denmark, causing the lead group to stay together for several laps. Betsema and Cant took turns leading the group, before Neff was the first to drop behind in lap four. Although this led to a situation of four Dutch riders against Belgian Sanne Cant, the Dutch never cooperated and all rode their individual race.

During lap six, when leading the race and attempting a bike change, Brand fell as her left foot was still locked in the pedal while her bicycle was pulled out from under her by her mechanic (which later turned out to be her father). While she lost valuable seconds, Sanne Cant suddenly opened up a small gap between her and the four Dutch riders.

Going into the last lap, Cant lead with a six-second gap over Brand and Vos, with Betsema and Worst another seven seconds behind them. At that point, Keough and Neff were already over a minute back in sixth and seventh place. During the last lap, Brand soon opened a gap between her and Vos, but remained between four and ten seconds behind Cant, allowing Cant to win her third consecutive title. Brand was visibly disappointed in second place, Vos remained third.

== Results ==
Rank	Cyclist	Time
Gold medal	Sanne Cant (BEL)	47' 53"
Silver medal	Lucinda Brand (NED)	+ 9"
Bronze medal	Marianne Vos (NED)	+ 15"
4	~~Denise Betsema (NED)~~	+ 25"
5	Annemarie Worst (NED)	+ 36"
6	Jolanda Neff (SUI)	+ 1' 16"
7	Kaitlin Keough (USA)	+ 1' 21"
8	Nikki Brammeier (GBR)	+ 1' 37"
9	Sophie De Boer (NED)	+ 1' 59"
10	Ellen Van Loy (BEL)	+ 2' 05"
11	Laura Verdonschot (BEL)	+ 2' 05"
12	Alice Maria Arzuffi (ITA)	+ 2' 08"
13	Christine Majerus (LUX)	+ 2' 08"
14	Loes Sels (BEL)	+ 2' 27"
15	Helen Wyman (GBR)	+ 2' 29"
16	Rebecca Fahringer (USA)	+ 2' 41"
17	Eva Lechner (ITA)	+ 2' 48"
18	Elisabeth Brandau (GER)	+ 2' 52"
19	Marlene Petit (FRA)	+ 3' 01"
20	Kateřina Nash (CZE)	+ 3' 13"
21	Ellen Noble (USA)	+ 3' 21"
22	Lucía González Blanco (ESP)	+ 3' 27"
23	Maghalie Rochette (CAN)	+ 3' 33"
24	Nadja Heigl (AUT)	+ 3' 48"
25	Maud Kaptheijns (NED)	+ 3' 52"
26	Bethany Crumpton (GBR)	+ 3' 52"
27	Aida Nuño Palacio (ESP)	+ 4' 28"
28	Ida Erngren (SWE)	+ 4' 34"
29	Karla Stepanova (CZE)	+ 4' 50"
30	Samantha Runnels (USA)	+ 4' 59"
31	Zina Barhoumi (SUI)	+ 5' 15"
32	Caroline Mani (FRA)	+ 5' 34"
33	Pavla Havlíková (CZE)	+ 5' 39"
34	Katie Compton (USA)	+ 5' 57"
35	Viktoria Smidth Knudsen (DEN)	+ 5' 57"
36	Zuzanna Krzystala (POL)	+ 6' 58"
37	Sandra Trevilla Samperio (ESP)	+ 2 laps
38	Signe Koch (DEN)	+ 2 laps
39	Miho Imai (JPN)	+ 3 laps
40	Karolina Cierluk (POL)	+ 3 laps
