= Maurice Seynaeve =

Belgian cyclist

Maurice Seynaeve (Heule (near Kortrijk) Belgium, 31 January 1907 – Florencio Varela, Buenos Aires Argentina, 28 November 1998) was a Belgian Cyclo-cross rider in the years 1928–1940. Maurice Seynaeve won the Belgian National Cyclo-cross Championships from 1933 to 1937. Maurice Seynaeve also participated in classical road races like Ronde van Vlaanderen (Tour of Flanders – 3rd place, 1928) and Ronde van België (Tour of Belgium 3rd place Stage 1, 1931).

A series of pictures from the estate of Helena and Maurice Seynaeve can be found here. In the pictures are other riders from the same period including Jean Aerts, Gustave Degreef, Éloi Meulenberg and Kamiel Vermassen

== Major wins ==
1933
National Championship, Cyclo-cross, Belgium
1934
National Championship, Cyclo-cross, Belgium
Critérium International de Cyclo-cross, France (Unofficial World Championship)
1935
National Championship, Cyclo-cross, Belgium
1936
National Championship, Cyclo-cross, Belgium
Critérium International de Cyclo-cross, France (Unofficial World Championship)
1937
National Championship, Cyclo-cross, Belgium
