= Firmin Van Kerrebroeck =

Belgian cyclo-cross cyclist (1922–2011)

Personal information
- Born: 14 December 1922 Wondelgem, Belgium
- Died: 17 August 2011 (aged 88) Oudenaarde, Belgium

Cycling career
- Sport: Cycling
- Disciplines: Cyclo-cross; Road
- Role: Rider; Manager

Professional teams
- 1948–1949: Dardenne
- 1949: Terrot–Hutchinson
- 1949–1950: La Gantoise
- 1950–1952: Mercier–Hutchinson
- 1955–1958: Groene Leeuw
- 1959: Coppi
- 1960–1966: Groene Leeuw–Sinalco–SAS

Managerial team
- Belgian national team

Major wins
- Cyclo-cross National Championships (1950, 1952, 1955, 1956, 1958, 1961)
Medal record
Men's cyclo-cross
Representing Belgium
World Championships
Silver medal – second place	1957 Edelare	Elite race

Firmin Van Kerrebroeck (14 December 1922 – 17 August 2011) was a Belgian cyclo-cross cyclist. Professional from 1947 to 1966, he won the Belgian National Cyclo-cross Championships six times and a silver medal at the 1957 UCI Cyclo-cross World Championships, winning a total of 44 cyclo-crosses during his career. During the summer, he also occasionally competed in road races. He then coached the Belgian national team for sixteen years and won twenty world championship titles with his riders, notably Eric and Roger De Vlaeminck and Roland Liboton.
