= Jan Verstraeten =

Belgian cyclist

Personal information
- Born: 11 March 1978 (age 48) Lier, Belgium

Cycling career
- Sport: Cycling
- Discipline: Racing
- Role: Rider

Jan Verstraeten (born 11 March 1978 in Lier) is a Belgian professional racing cyclist.

== Career highlights ==
1999
2nd in Moerbeke, Cyclo-cross (BEL)

2000
1st in Circuit du Hainaut (BEL)
1st in Stage 3 Tour de Liège, Blegny-Mine (BEL)
1st in Stage 5 Tour de Liège, Seraing (BEL)
3rd in Brussel - Opwijk (BEL)
3rd in GP Wielerrevue (NED)

2003
3rd in Oostende, Cyclo-cross (BEL)
3rd in Schriek, Derny (BEL)

2004
2nd in Huijbergen, Cyclo-cross (NED)

2005
1st in GP Etienne de Wilde (BEL)
3rd in Ardooie, Cyclo-cross (BEL)

2006
1st in Kayl, Cyclo-cross (LUX)
2nd in Zonnebeke, Cyclo-cross (BEL)
3rd in GP Etienne de Wilde (BEL)

2007
3rd in Otegem, Cyclo-cross (BEL)

2008
2nd in Otegem, Cyclo-cross (BEL)
