= Anja Nobus =

Belgian cyclist

Personal information
- Born: 9 April 1974 (age 52)

Cycling career
- Sport: Cycling
- Disciplines: Road cycling, cyclo-cross
- Role: Rider

Anja Nobus (born 9 April 1974) is a Belgian cyclist. She participates in both road cycling and in cyclo-cross. In 2002 and 2004 she became Belgian national champion in cyclo-cross, and in 2003 she became Belgian road race champion.

== Palmarès ==
2001
2nd Belgian National Cyclo-cross Championships

2002
1st (Belgium) Belgian National Cyclo-cross Championships

2003
1st (Belgium) Belgian National Road Race Championships
1st Gravere-Asper
1st Lille, Belgium
2nd Belgian National Cyclo-cross Championships
3rd Hoogerheide
3rd Kalmthout

2004
1st (Belgium) Belgian National Cyclo-cross Championships
2nd Gravere-Asper
3rd Oostmalle

2005
1st Lille, Belgium
2nd Belgian National Cyclo-cross Championships
3rd Gravere-Asper

2006
2nd Lille, Belgium
3rd Belgian National Cyclo-cross Championships
3rd Sint-Michielsgestel (2006/07 Cyclo-cross Superprestige)
