= Bobby Vardaro =

American football player (born 1991)

Profile
- Position: Guard

Personal information
- Born: November 26, 1991 (age 34); North Reading, Massachusetts
- Listed height: 6 ft 5 in (1.96 m)
- Listed weight: 317 lb (144 kg)

Career information
- High school: Phillips Academy Andover
- College: Boston College
- NFL draft: 2015: undrafted

Career history
- Minnesota Vikings (2015)*
- * Offseason or practice squad member only

Bobby Vardaro is an American former football guard. He played college football at Boston College. He was signed by the Vikings as an undrafted free agent in 2015.

== Early life ==
Vardaro attended Phillips Academy Andover in Andover, Massachusetts, where he was a two-time Eagle-Tribune all-star as an offensive lineman, playing both nose guard and offensive tackle for the Big Blue for head coach Leon Modeste. As a senior, he earned NEPSAC All-New England Class A honors.

Vardaro also competed on the school's track & field team; he won the shot put (53 feet, 7 inches or 16.38m) and discus (119 feet, 8 inches or 36.50m) events at the 2010 New England Class A Prep School meet.

== Professional career ==
Pre-draft measurables
Height	Weight	20-yard shuttle	Three-cone drill	Vertical jump	Broad jump	Bench press
6 ft 4 in (1.93 m)	309 lb (140 kg)	4.59 s	7.43 s	28 in (0.71 m)	8 ft 8 in (2.64 m)	34 reps
All values from Pro Day

Vardaro did not hear his name called during the 2015 NFL draft, but signed with the Minnesota Vikings as an undrafted free agent shortly after the draft.
