= Koersel =

Village in Belgium

Coordinates: 51°03′31″N 5°16′18″E

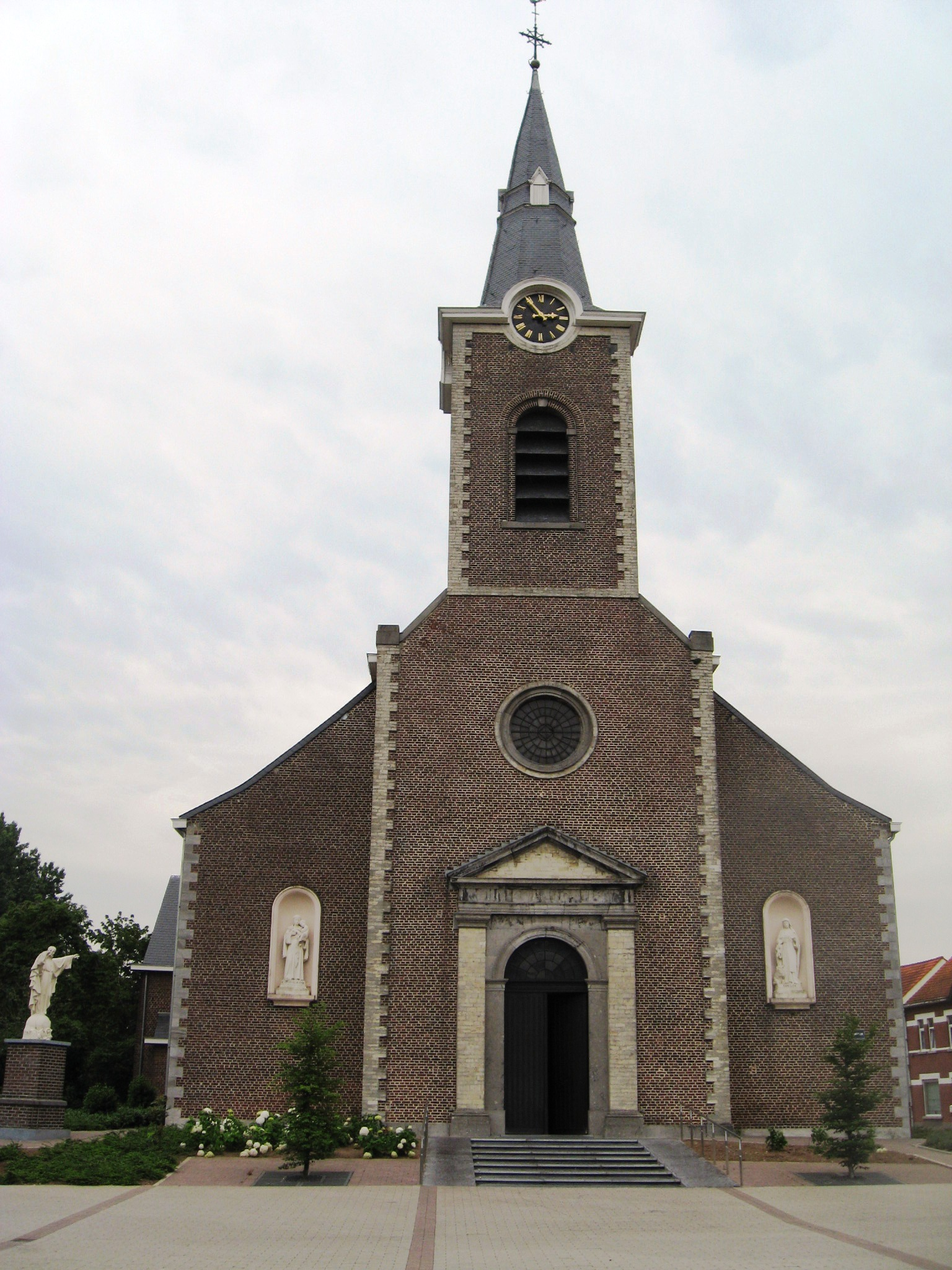
Sint-Brigidakerk in Koersel

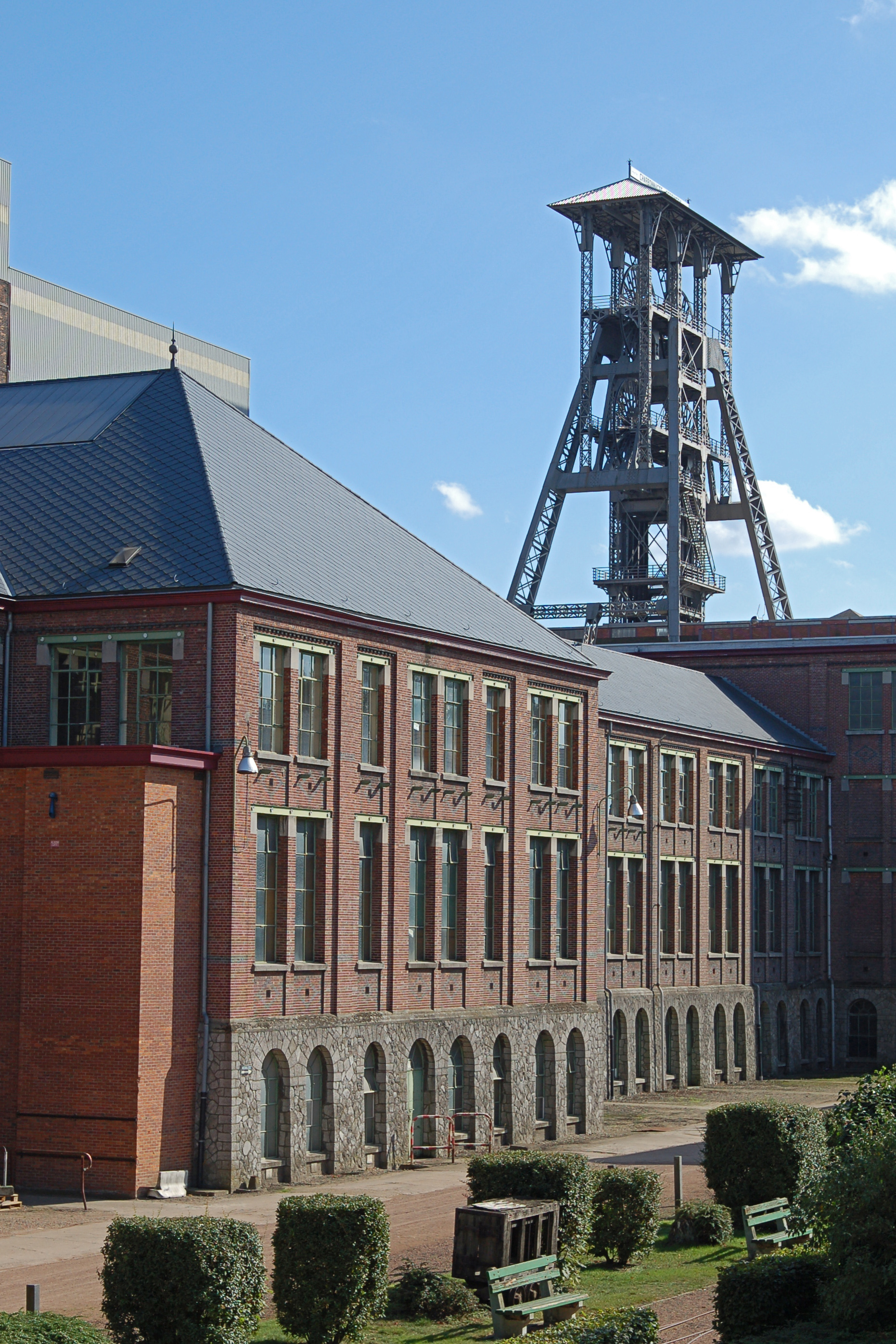
The defunct Beringen coal mine is located in Koersel

Koersel is a village in the Belgian province of Limburg and is a submunicipality of Beringen. It was an independent municipality until 1977. It has around 18,000 inhabitants.

== History ==
Koersel was first mentioned in 1166 as Corsela; either from the Latin curticella: small farm, or from the Germanic Corsala: Cor's farm.

In 1909, started the construction of the Beringen coal mine and in October 1919 the first coal seam was reached at a depth of 623 metres. The football stadium of Koersel is Mijnstadion (translated: mine stadium).
