= Alla Yepifanova =

Russian cyclist

Personal information
- Born: 2 December 1976 (age 49) Tolyatti, Russia

Cycling career
- Sport: Cycling

Alla Yepifanova (born 2 December 1976) is a Russian cyclist. She competed at the 1996 Summer Olympics and the 2000 Summer Olympics.
