= Gravere =

Municipality in Piedmont, Italy

Gravere Gravere (Piedmontese) Gravere (Arpitan) Gravière (French)
- Comune
- Comune di Gravere
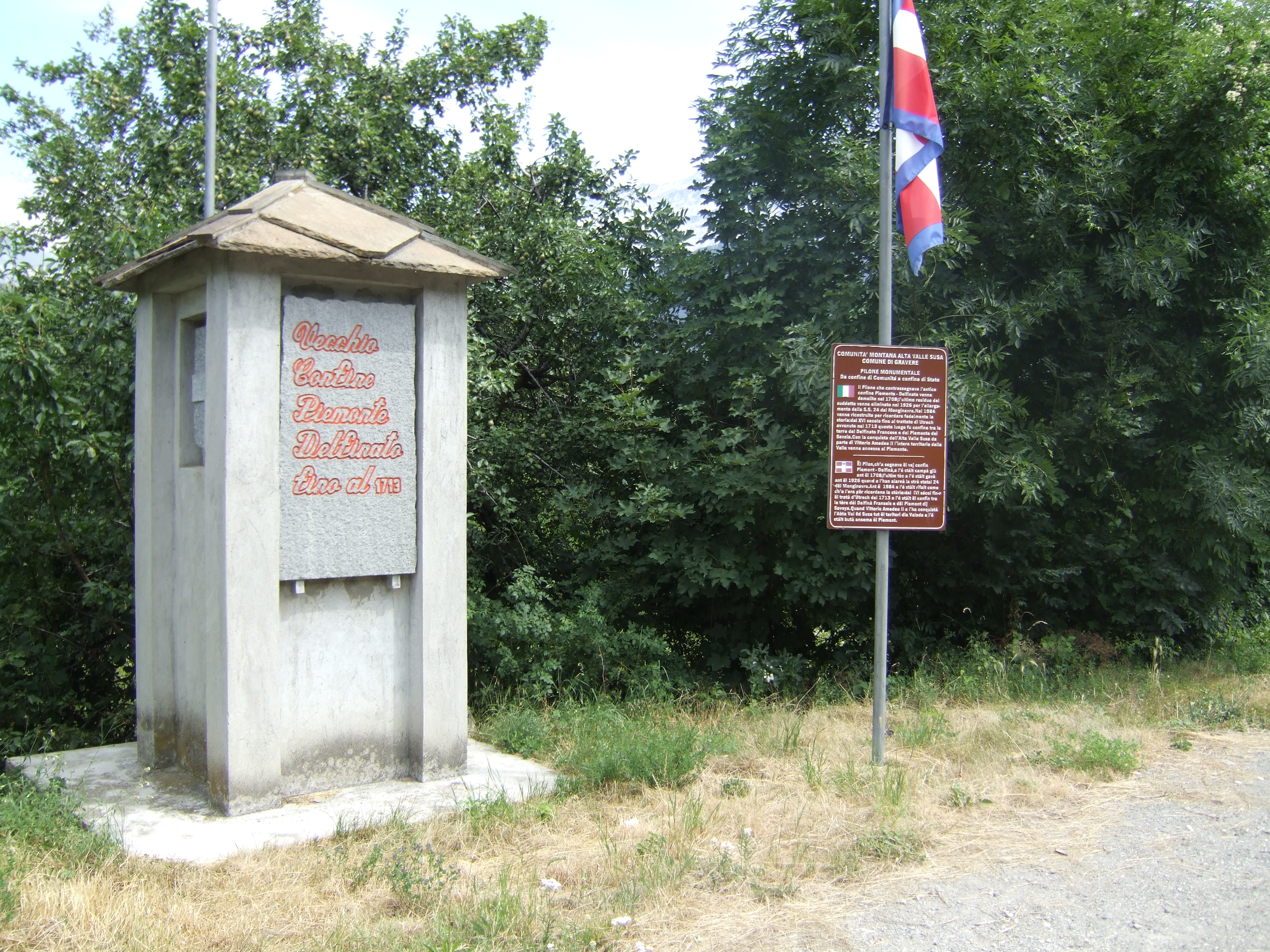
- Memorial of the ancient boundary between the Duchy of Savoy and the Kingdom of France

- Location within Italy Location within Piedmont
- Coordinates: 45°8′N 7°1′E
- Country: Italy
- Region: Piedmont
- Metropolitan city: Turin (TO)

Government
  - Mayor: Piero Franco Nurisso

Area
  - Total: 18.7 km^{2} (7.2 sq mi)
- Elevation: 821 m (2,694 ft)

Population (31 August 2017)
  - Total: 679
  - Density: 36.3/km^{2} (94.0/sq mi)
- Demonym: Anciently Gelassani
- Time zone: UTC+1 (CET)
  - Summer (DST): UTC+2 (CEST)
- Postal code: 10050
- Dialing code: 0122
- Website: Official website

Gravere (Piedmontese and Arpitan: Gravere; French: Gravière) is a comune (municipality) in the Metropolitan City of Turin in the Italian region Piedmont, located about 50 kilometres (31 mi) west of Turin. Until 1713, it was the first commune in the Val di Susa in the Duchy of Savoy when coming from France, as the upper part of the valley was part of the latter kingdom.
