= Louise Robinson (cyclist) =

British cyclist

Personal information
- Born: 12 January 1965 (age 61)

Cycling career
- Sport: Cycling

Louise Robinson (born 12 January 1965) is a British cyclist. She took the silver medal at the inaugural women's race at the UCI Cyclo-cross World Championships in 2000. She also competed in the women's cross-country mountain biking event at the 2000 Summer Olympics. She is the daughter and niece of fellow racing cyclists Brian Robinson and Desmond Robinson respectively.
