= Katleen Vermeiren =

Belgian cyclist

Personal information
- Born: 23 September 1978 (age 48) Herentals, Belgium

Cycling career
- Sport: Cycling
- Disciplines: Road, Cyclo-cross

Katleen Vermeiren (born 23 September 1978) is a Cyclo cross rider and road cyclist from Belgium. She is the 2001 Belgium cyclo cross champion. On the road she represented her nation at the 2005 UCI Road World Championships.
