= Hilde Quintens =

Belgian cyclist

Personal information
- Born: 2 October 1964 (age 62) Zolder, Belgium

Cycling career
- Sport: Cycling
- Discipline: Cyclo-cross
- Role: Rider

Hilde Quintens (born 2 October 1964) is a Belgian cyclist born in Zolder. She participates mainly in cyclo-cross. In 2003 and 2006 she became Belgian national champion in cyclo-cross.

Quintens retired from cycling in 2007, but returned to competition in 2012, when she was third in the Belgian National Cyclo-cross Championships. She competed again in 2023.

She lives in Lummen.

== Major results ==
2002
2nd in Hoogerheide
3rd in Belgian National Cyclo-cross Championships

2003
1st in Belgian National Cyclo-cross Championships
1st in Overijse
2nd in Gavere-Asper
2nd in Lille, Belgium
3rd in Vossem
3rd in Kersttrofee Hofstade
3rd in Loenhout

2004
1st in Gavere-Asper

2005
1st in Gavere-Asper
3rd in Lille, Belgium

2006
1st in Belgian National Cyclo-cross Championships
1st in Gavere-Asper (2006/07 Cyclo-cross Superprestige)

2012
3rd in Belgian National Cyclo-cross Championships

2023
National champion, Belgian Gravel Championship in Oud-Heverlee
1st in women aged 60-64, World Championship in Hamburg
