= Katrien Aerts =

Belgian freestyle skier

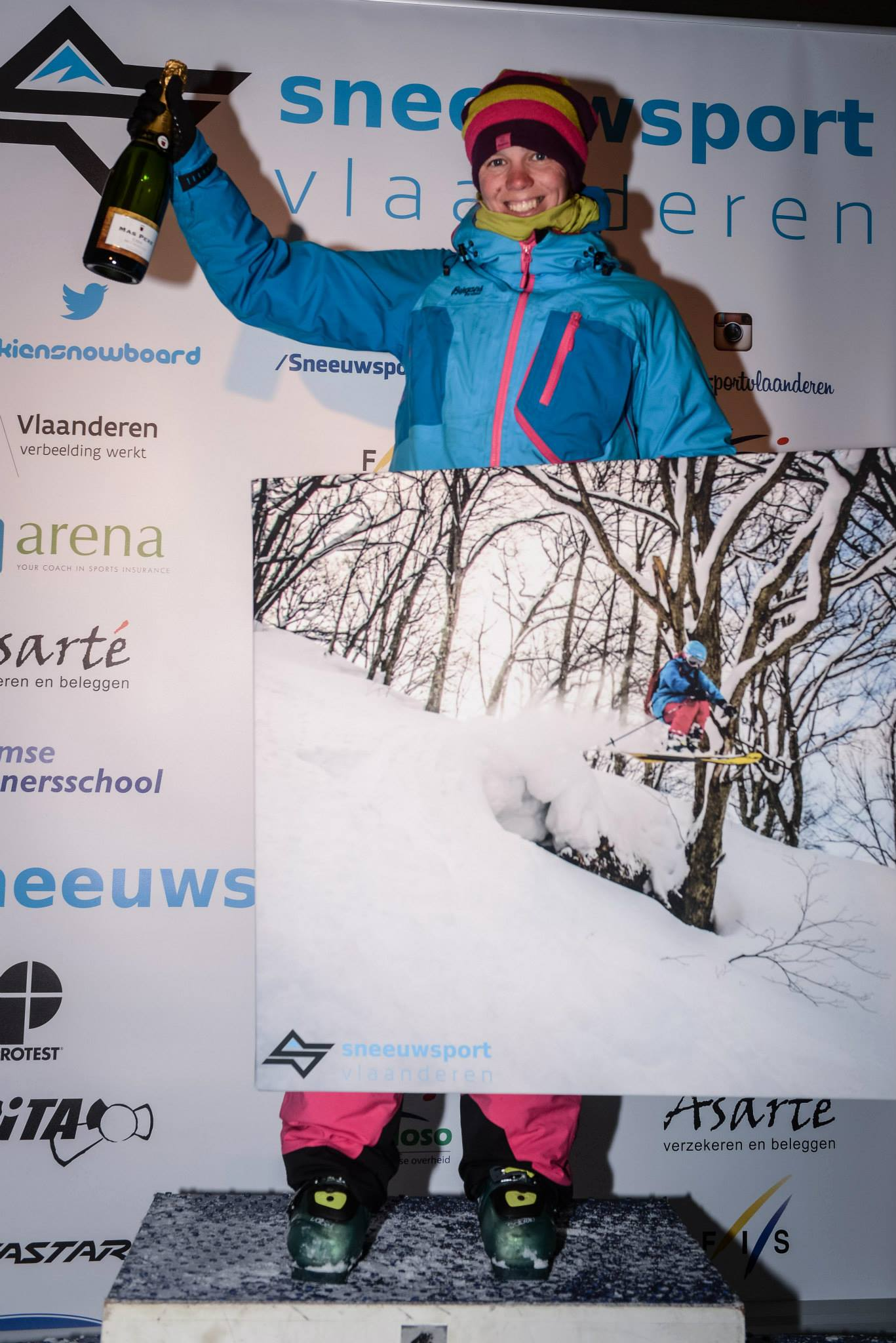

Personal information
- Born: 15 March 1976 (age 50) Geel, Belgium
- Height: 1.60 m (5 ft 3 in)
- Weight: 66 kg (146 lb)

Sport
- Country: Belgium
- Sport: Freestyle skiing

Katrien Aerts (born 15 March 1976 in Geel) is a Belgian skiing athlete. She is a multiple Belgian Champion in freestyle, freeride and ski cross and has competed in World Cup and Winter Olympics.

== Events attended ==
In 2008 she finished fourth in the Open American Championship Slopestyle.

In 2011 she was third in the FIS World Cup Halfpipe competition in Kreischberg in Austria and fifth in the season, 8th in the FIS World Championships in Halfpipe and third in the European open championships Halfpipe. That year she also finished seventh in the Winter X Games Europe Superpipe.

In 2012 she was tenth all over the season of the FIS World Cup Halfpipe and also eighth in the Winter X Games Europe Superpipe.

In 2013 she finished eighth in the FIS World Cup Halfpipe, 13th at the FIS World Championships Halfpipe in qualifying and 15th in the WC Slopestyle also in qualifying.

In 2014 she participated in the Olympic Winter Games in Sochi in the discipline halfpipe skiing which was on the program for the first time. She finished in 17th place.

After her last participation in a freestyle skiing world championship in 2015 in Kreischberg, where she won a 7th place.
