= Susanne Juranek =

German cyclist

Personal information
- Born: February 25, 1975 (age 51) Brake, Lower Saxony

Cycling career
- Sport: Cycling
- Disciplines: Cyclo-cross, road cycling
- Role: Rider

Professional team
- Bertram Roemer

Susanne Juranek (born 25 February 1975 in Brake, Lower Saxony) is a German cyclist born in Brake a. d. Unterweser but spent her childhood and teenager years in Goslar where she began mountain biking. Later she moved to Oldenburg and due to the "flatter" landscape she started to shift to cyclo-cross and road cycling for the AGC team Bertram Roemer. She participates internationally mainly in cyclo-cross.

== Honours ==
=== Cyclo-cross ===
2005
3rd Internationales Querfeldeinrennen

2006
2nd Hamburg A
1st Hamburg B
2nd Berlin
2nd Wouden
3rd Gieten (2006/07 Cyclo-cross Superprestige)
