= Vania Rossi =

Italian cyclist

Personal information
- Full name: Vania Rossi
- Born: 3 October 1983 (age 43)

Cycling career
- Sport: Cycling
- Discipline: Cyclo-cross
- Role: Rider

Professional team
- 2004-2010: USC Chirio Forno d'Asolo

Vania Rossi (born 3 October 1983) is a professional cyclocross bicycle racer from Italy. On 29 January 2010 Rossi was reported positive for EPO CERA by the Italian Olympic Committee. The Comitato Olimpico Nazionale Italiano (CONI) controlled her on 10 January after she finished second in the women's national cyclocross championships. However, on 2 April CONI revealed that the B Sample was returned non-positive. Rossi is the partner of Italian professional road bicycle racer Riccardo Riccò, who himself tested positive for CERA at the 2008 Tour de France.
