= Joyce Vanderbeken =

Belgian cyclist

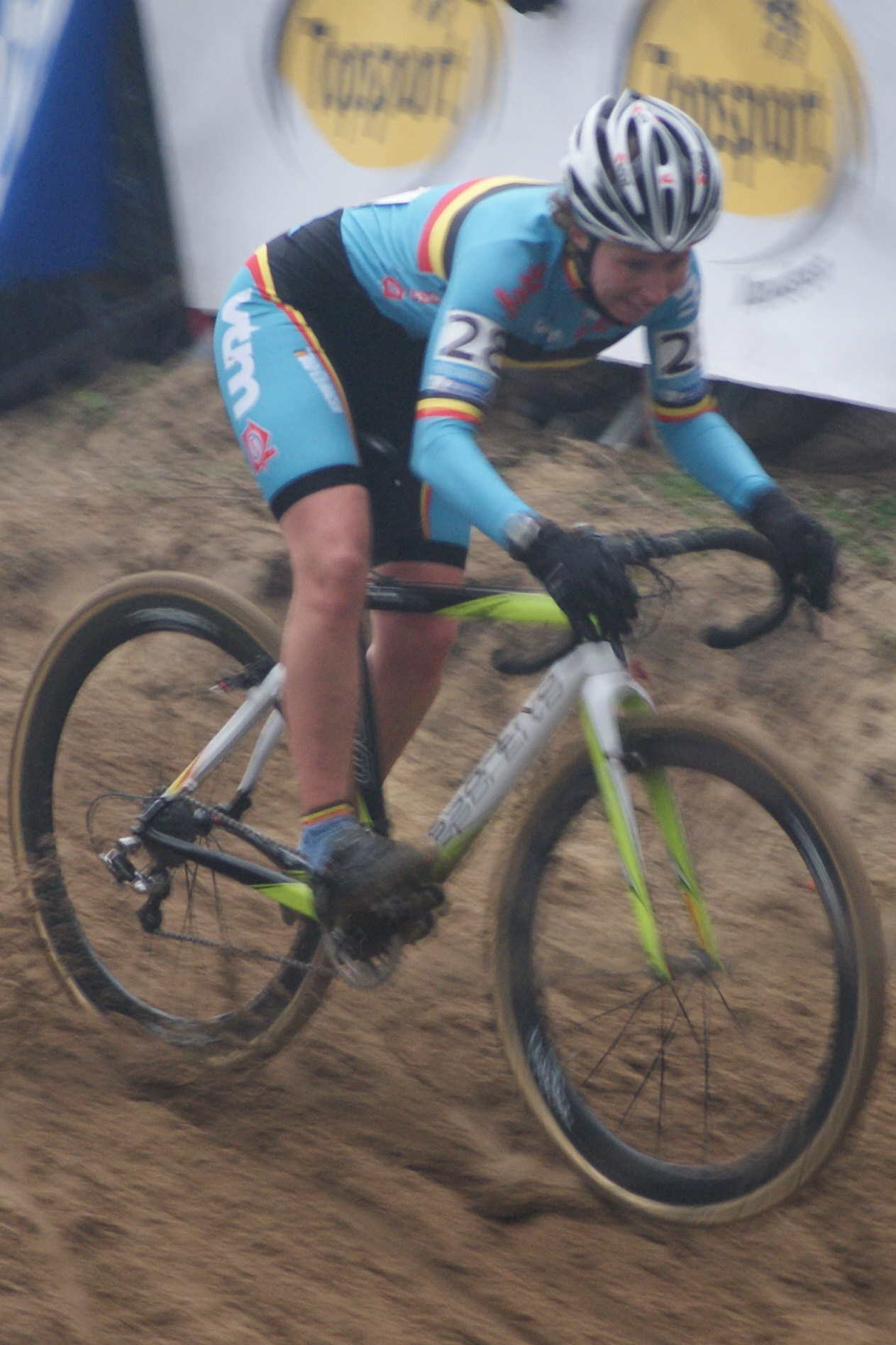

Personal information
- Born: 26 August 1984 (age 42)

Cycling career
- Sport: Cycling
- Discipline: Cyclo-cross
- Role: Rider

Professional teams
- 2007: Lingier–Versluys Team
- 2016: Decock–Van Eyck–Devos Capoen

Joyce Vanderbeken (born 26 August 1984) is a Belgian female cyclo-cross cyclist. She represented her nation in the women's elite event at the 2016 UCI Cyclo-cross World Championships in Heusden-Zolder.
