= Christine Vardaros =

American cyclist

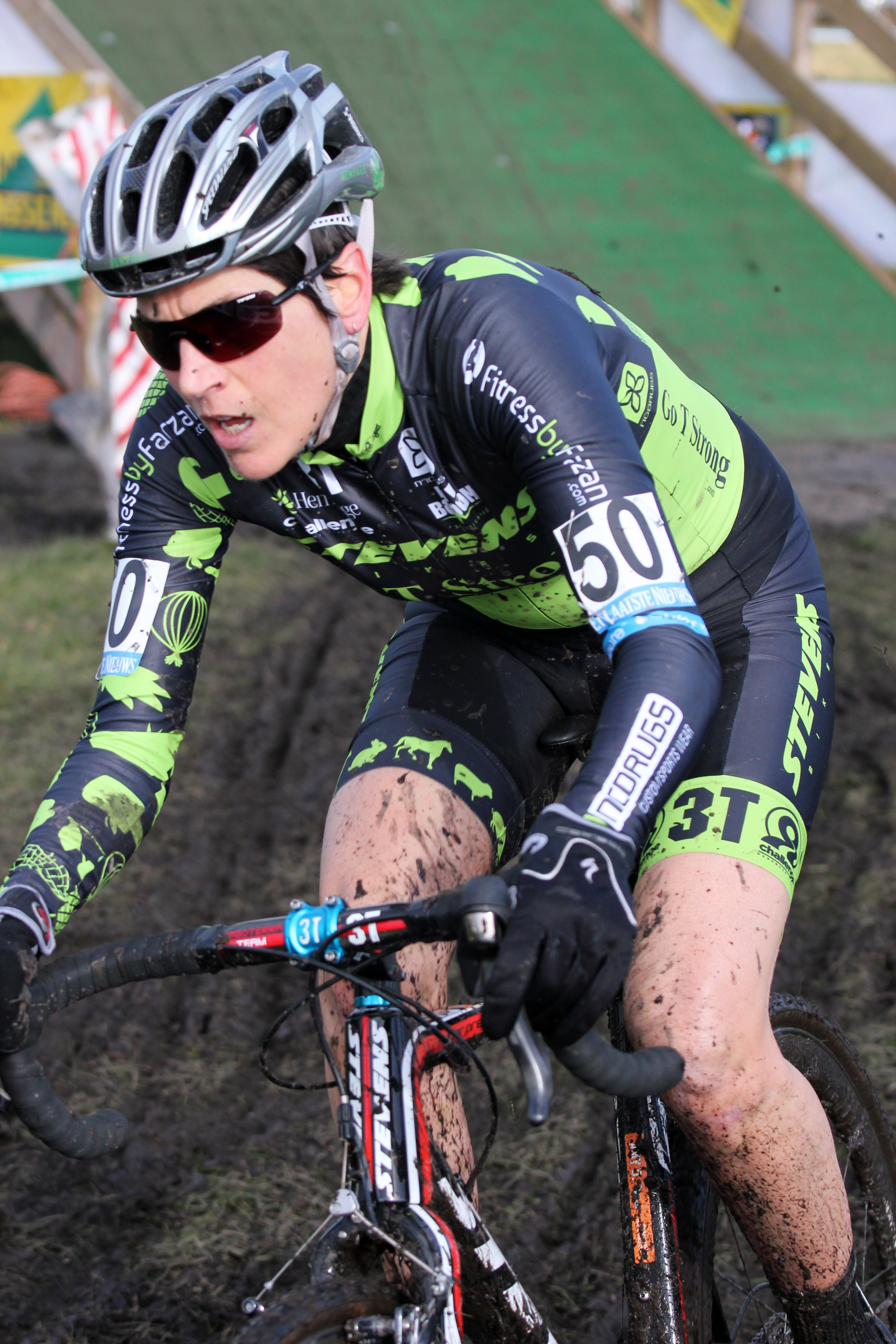
- Christine Vardaros at Cyclo-cross Superprestige Hoogstraten

Personal information
- Full name: Christine Vardaros
- Nickname: Peanut
- Born: 19 July 1969 (age 57) New York, US
- Height: 1.76 m (5 ft 9 in)
- Weight: 57 kg (126 lb)

Cycling career
- Sport: Cycling
- Current team: Stevens Pro Cycling
- Disciplines: Cyclo-cross; Mountain bike racing Road
- Role: Rider

Professional teams
- 1996–1999: Team Breezer MTB
- 1999–2001: Jamba Juice MTB Team
- 2002: Sally Spicer
- 2003–2006: Velo Bella
- 2006: Lotto-Belisol Ladies Team
- 2007: Les Pruneaux d'Agen
- 2007–2008: Vanderkitten
- 2009–2010: Zannata-Champion System
- 2010–2013: Baboco Cycling Team
- 2013–: Stevens Pro Cycling

Christine "Peanut" Vardaros is a vegan professional cyclist, both vegan and professional since 2000. She began her cycling career in 1996 as a mountain biker for Team Breezer run by Joe Breeze while still living in her hometown of Manhattan. In 2008, she relocated to Mill Valley, California, to pursue her goal of becoming a professional which she achieved two years later. In 2002, she transitioned from the mountain bike to the road and cyclo-cross. In 2008, Vardaros again relocated to her current residence in Everberg, Belgium. Since this relocation, she is most known as a cyclo-cross specialist.

She represented USA Cycling at 3 World Cyclo-Cross Championships as well as over 25 Cyclo-Cross World Cups since year 2002. In addition, she has made many appearances to the podium of UCI International events, including a few wins.

Vardaros has been profiled in many magazines, newspapers and other media outlets for her cycling accomplishments as well as for her vegan diet. She has appeared in websites such as Yoga Journal, Slowtwitch.com, Vivalavegan.net, Vegtomato.org (in Chinese), Roadbikereview.com, Dailypeloton.com and Greatveganathletes.com.

In addition, Vardaros is spokesperson for In Defense of Animals, The Vegan Society, and Physicians Committee for Responsible Medicine.

Vardaros graduated from Columbia College of Columbia University in 1991.
