= Veerle Ingels =

Belgian cyclist

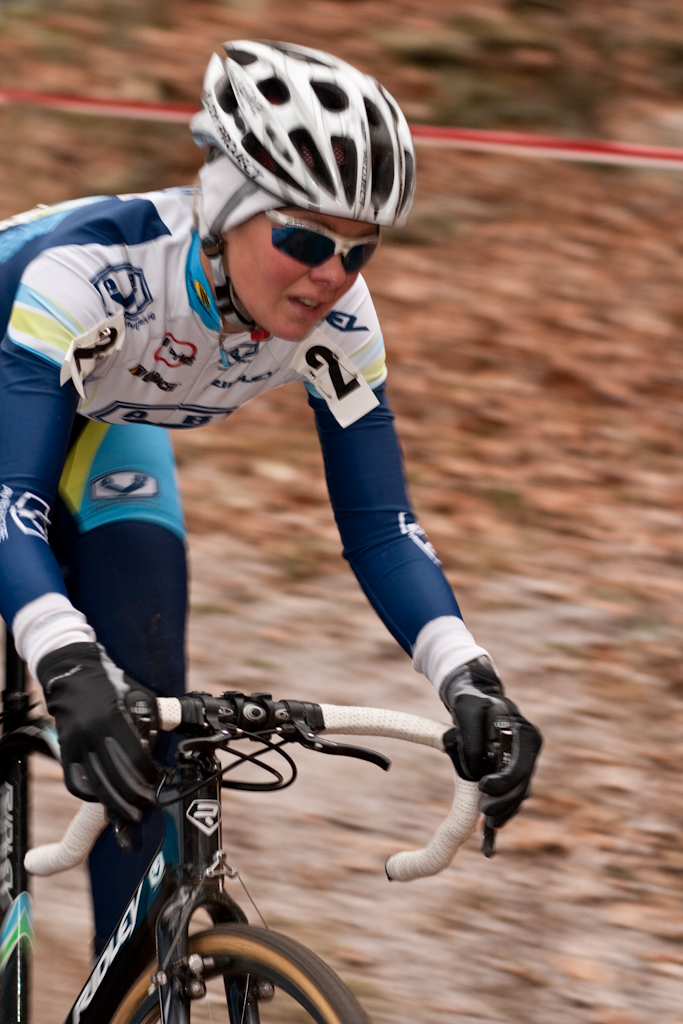

Personal information
- Born: 24 December 1981 (age 44)

Cycling career
- Sport: Cycling
- Disciplines: Road cycling, cyclo-cross
- Role: Rider

Veerle Ingels (born 24 December 1981) is a Belgian racing cyclist. She participates both in road cycling as in cyclo-cross. In 2005, she became Belgian national champion in cyclo-cross.

== Major results ==
=== Road cycling ===
2003
3rd in Belgian elite national championships

=== Cyclo-cross ===
2003
3rd in Belgian elite national championships

2005
1st in Belgian elite national championships
2nd in Gavere-Asper
3rd in Koppenberg

2006
1st in Lebbeke
3rd in Gavere-Asper (2006/07 Cyclo-cross Superprestige)
