= Mario De Clercq =

Belgian cyclist

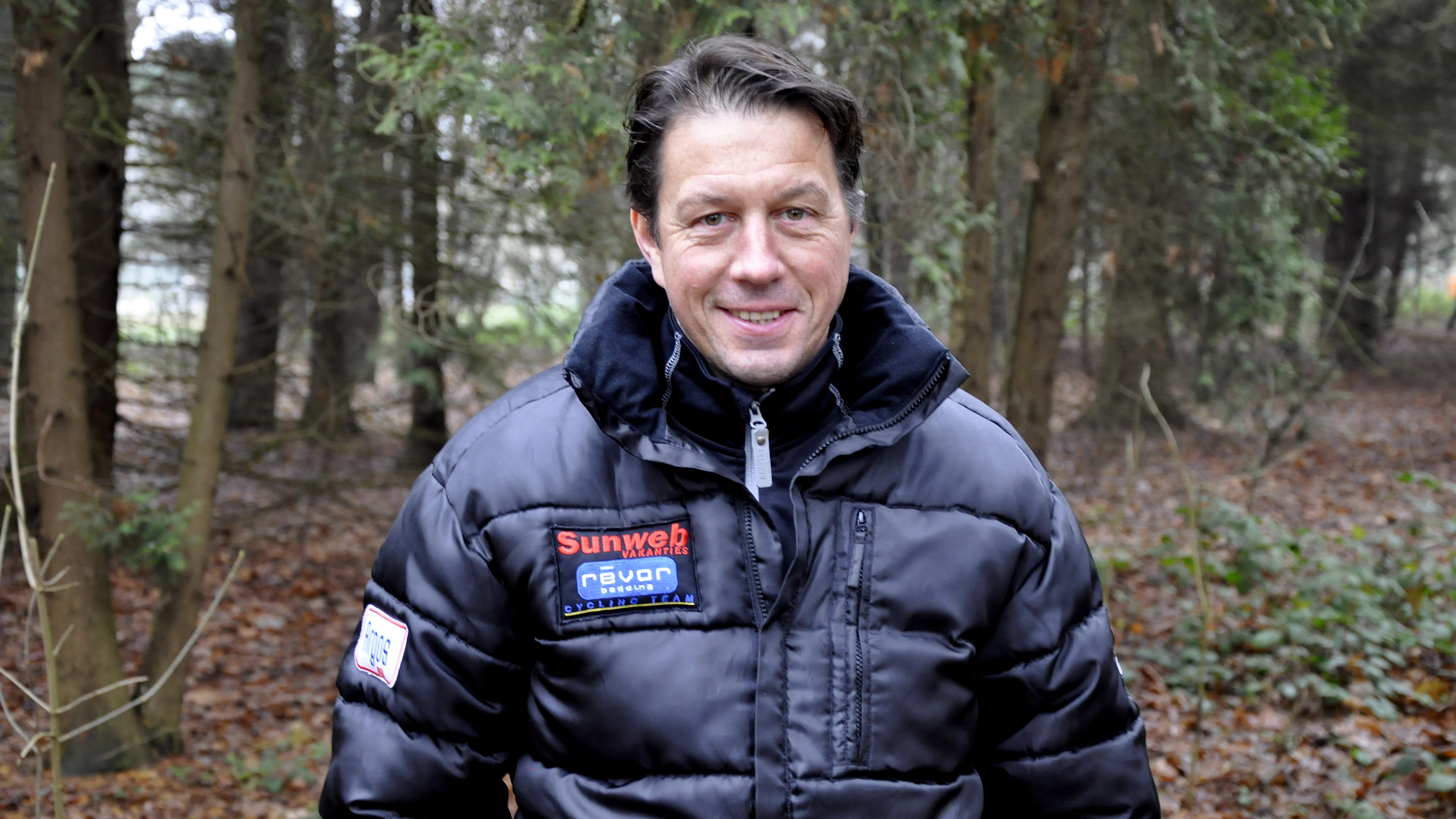

Personal information
- Full name: Mario De Clercq
- Born: 5 March 1966 (age 60) Oudenaarde, Belgium
- Height: 1.74 m (5 ft 9 in)
- Weight: 66 kg (146 lb)

Cycling career
- Sport: Cycling
- Disciplines: Cyclo-cross; Road
- Role: Rider; Directeur sportif

Professional teams
- 1991–1992: Buckler–Colnago–Decca
- 1993–1995: Lotto
- 1996–2000: Palmans–Boghemans
- 2001: Domo–Farm Frites–Latexco
- 2002–2003: Palmans–Collstrop
- 2004: Mr. Bookmaker–Palmans–Collstrop

Managerial team
- 2007–2015: Sunweb–Projob
Medal record
Representing Belgium
Men's cyclo-cross
World Championships
| Gold medal – first place | 1998 Middelfart | Elite race |
| Gold medal – first place | 1999 Poprad | Elite race |
| Gold medal – first place | 2002 Zolder | Elite race |
| Silver medal – second place | 2000 Sint-Michielsgestel | Elite race |
| Silver medal – second place | 2003 Monopoli | Elite race |
| Silver medal – second place | 2004 Montchâteux | Elite race |
| Bronze medal – third place | 2001 Tábor | Elite race |

Mario De Clercq (born 5 March 1966) is a Belgian former racing cyclist. He specialized in cyclo-cross racing but also rode on the road and circuit races during his career, he raced as a professional between 1991 and 2004. The majority of his years as a professional were under the sponsorship of Palmans–Boghemans and its various co-sponsors.

== Biography ==
Born in Oudenaarde, Belgium, De Clercq is a three-time world cyclo-cross champion capturing the 1998, 1999 and 2002 UCI Cyclo-cross World Championships. In addition, De Clercq won the 2001 and 2002 Belgian National Cyclo-cross Championships.

Accused of being in possession of banned substances, along with Johan Museeuw and nine other riders, investigators visited their houses in 2003, they faced an initial hearing in Kortrijk on 11 October 2005. De Clercq was due to stand trial on drug charges at a Belgian Court in 2006.

De Clercq, along with Hans De Clercq (no relation), has been managing the Sunweb - Pro Job Cycling Team since early 2007.

In September 2007, the long-awaited trial began. De Clercq was found in possession of human growth hormone and Aranesp, a synthetic drug which increases red blood cell levels, which Museeuw obtained from Jose Landuyt. The court proceedings were adjourned until 23 September 2008, pending a ruling from the Constitutional Court on the point of law.

== Major results ==
1985
2nd Belgian National Cyclo-cross Championships, Juniors
1988
1st Stage 4b, Circuit Franco-Belge, Roubaix (BEL)
1988
3rd Stage 2, Triptyque Ardennaise, Polleur (BEL)
1989
2nd Seraing-Aachen-Seraing (BEL)
2nd Stage 1, Tour de Liège, Warsage (BEL)
1990
3rd Stage 5b, Circuit Franco-Belge, Roubaix (BEL)
2nd Stage 2b, Ronde van België, Amateurs, Aarschot (BEL)
1st Stage 8, Ronde van België, Amateurs, Knokke-Heist (BEL)
1991
2nd Omloop van het Waasland – Kemzeke (BEL)
3rd Rund um Köln (GER)
1st Laarne (BEL)
1st Stage 1b, Vuelta a los Valles Mineros, Mieres (ESP)
1992
3rd Brabantse Pijl (BEL)
3rd Stekene (BEL)
3rd Stage 2, Tirreno – Adriatico (ITA)
1993
3rd GP de Wallonie (BEL)
3rd GP Wielerrevue (NED)
3rd Nokere Koerse (BEL)
3rd Stage 4, Etoile de Bessèges, Vergèze (FRA)
2nd Stage 3b, Route du Sud, Pau (FRA)
3rd Dentergem (BEL)
1994
3rd Aalst (BEL)
2nd Tour de Vendée (FRA)
3rd Stage 2, Vuelta a Andalucia (Ruta del Sol), Dos Hermanas (ESP)
2nd Geraardsbergen, Criterium (BEL)
1995
1st Tour de Vendée (FRA)
3rd Wanzele (BEL)
3rd Zomergem – Adinkerke (BEL)
1996
3rd Belgian National Cyclo-cross Championships
1st Pilzen, Cyclo-cross (TCH)
1st Zele (c) (BEL)
3rd Obergögsen, Cyclo-cross (SUI)
3rd Beveren-Leie (BEL)
3rd Wingene, Cyclo-cross (BEL)
2nd Moerbeke, Cyclo-cross (BEL)
1st Oostende, Cyclo-cross (BEL)
1st Geraardsbergen, Cyclo-cross (BEL)
2nd Montrevain, Cyclo-cross (FRA)
8th Eschenbach, Cyclo-cross (SUI)
3rd Hagendorf, Cyclo-cross (SUI)
1st Plzeň, Cyclo-cross (CZE)
3rd Nommay, Cyclo-cross (FRA)
3rd Loenhout, Cyclo-cross (BEL)
3rd Diegem, Cyclo-cross (BEL)
1997
2nd Belgian National Cyclo-cross Championships
2nd General Classification Superprestige, Cyclo-cross
3rd Otegem, Cyclo-cross (BEL)
2nd Schulteiss-Cup, Cyclo-cross (GER)
1st Geraardsbergen, Cyclo-cross (BEL)
2nd Hagendorf, Cyclo-cross (SUI)
3rd Vossem, Cyclo-cross (BEL)
6th Eschenbach, Cyclo-cross (SUI)
1st Tabor, Cyclo-cross (CZE)
2nd Dijon, Cyclo-cross (FRA)
2nd Zürich-Waid, Cyclo-cross (SUI)
2nd Sint-Michielsgestel, Cyclo-cross (NED)
1st Milano, Cyclo-cross (ITA)
1st Zingem, Cyclo-cross (BEL)
1st Veldegem, Cyclo-cross (BEL)
1998
1st UCI Cyclo-cross World Championships
3rd Belgian National Cyclo-cross Championships
3rd General Classification Superprestige, Cyclo-cross
3rd Vossem, Cyclo-cross (BEL)
3rd Heerlen, Cyclo-cross (NED)
3rd Wetzikon, Cyclo-cross (SUI)
3rd Eeklo, Cyclo-cross (BEL)
1st Schulteiss-Cup, Cyclo-cross (GER)
1st Val André, Cyclo-cross (FRA)
1st Vossem, Cyclo-cross (BEL)
3rd Ruddervoorde, Cyclo-cross (BEL)
3rd Hagendorf, Cyclo-cross (SUI)
1st Steinsel-Contern, Cyclo-cross (LUX)
4th Eschenbach, Cyclo-cross (SUI)
1st Niel, Cyclo-cross (BEL)
1st Zonnebeke, Cyclo-cross (BEL)
1st Gavere – Asper, Cyclo-cross (BEL)
3rd Tabor, Cyclo-cross (CZE)
2nd Sint-Michielsgestel, Cyclo-cross (NED)
3rd Leudelange, Cyclo-cross (LUX)
2nd Vlaamse Druivenveldrit Overijse, Cyclo-cross (BEL)
1st Surhuisterveen Centrumcross (NED)
2nd Essen, Cyclo-cross (BEL)
1st Koksijde, Cyclo-cross (BEL)
1st Rijkevorsel, Cyclo-cross (BEL)
1999
1st UCI Cyclo-cross World Championships
1st General Classification World Cup, Cyclo-cross, Elite
2nd Belgian National Cyclo-cross Championships
2nd Zeddam, Cyclo-cross (NED)
2nd Magstadt, Cyclo-cross (GER)
1st Vossem, Cyclo-cross (BEL)
3rd Nommay, Cyclo-cross (FRA)
3rd Wetzikon, Cyclo-cross (SUI)
3rd Harnes, Cyclo-cross (FRA)
1st Wilrijk (BEL)
1st Buggenhout (BEL)
2nd Schulteiss-Cup, Cyclo-cross (GER)
1st Koppenberg, Cyclo-cross (BEL)
3rd Steinsel-Contern, Cyclo-cross (LUX)
2nd Niel, Cyclo-cross (BEL)
2nd Zonnebeke, Cyclo-cross (BEL)
3rd Gavere – Asper, Cyclo-cross (BEL)
1st Tabor, Cyclo-cross (CZE)
2nd Gieten, Cyclo-cross (NED)
3rd Overijse, Cyclo-cross (BEL)
1st Zingem, Cyclo-cross (BEL)
2nd Veldegem, Cyclo-cross (BEL)
2000
2nd UCI Cyclo-cross World Championships
3rd General Classification World Cup, Cyclo-cross, Elite
3rd Belgian National Cyclo-cross Championships
3rd Steinsel-Contern, Cyclo-cross (LUX)
2nd Woerden, Cyclo-cross (NED)
1st Zeddam, Cyclo-cross (NED)
1st Magstadt, Cyclo-cross (GER)
2nd Otegem, Cyclo-cross (BEL)
3rd Nommay, Cyclo-cross (FRA)
3rd Wetzikon, Cyclo-cross (SUI)
3rd Harnes, Cyclo-cross (FRA)
1st Eeklo, Cyclo-cross (BEL)
1st Wielsbeke (BEL)
1st De Haan (BEL)
1st Zingem, Cyclo-cross (BEL)
1st Schulteiss-Cup, Cyclo-cross (GER)
3rd Vorselaar, Cyclo-cross (BEL)
1st Steinmaur, Cyclo-cross (SUI)
1st Koppenberg, Cyclo-cross (BEL)
3rd Gonderange, Cyclo-cross (LUX)
3rd Bergamo, Cyclo-cross (ITA)
3rd Tabor, Cyclo-cross (CZE)
1st Hoogstraten, Cyclo-cross (BEL)
1st Wortegem-Petegem, Cyclo-cross (BEL)
2nd Veldegem, Cyclo-cross (BEL)
3rd Diegem, Cyclo-cross (BEL)
2001
3rd UCI Cyclo-cross World Championships
3rd General Classification World Cup, Cyclo-cross, Elite
1st (Belgium) Belgian National Cyclo-cross Championships
2nd Diegem, Cyclo-cross (BEL)
2nd Overijse, Cyclo-cross (BEL)
1st Schulteiss-Cup, Cyclo-cross (GER)
2nd Baal, Cyclo-cross (BEL)
2nd Otegem, Cyclo-cross (BEL)
2nd Lanarvily, Cyclo-cross, Lanarvily (FRA)
2nd Eeklo, Cyclo-cross (BEL)
3rd Heerlen, Cyclo-cross (NED)
3rd Fourmies/Val Joly, Cyclo-cross (FRA)
1st Dottignies, Cyclo-cross (BEL)
1st La Cerisaie-Ballan, Cyclo-cross (FRA)
2nd Hoogstraten, Cyclo-cross (BEL)
1st Essen, Cyclo-cross (BEL)
1st Wortegem-Petegem, Cyclo-cross (BEL)
1st Zonnebeke, Cyclo-cross (BEL)
1st Hofstade, Cyclo-cross (BEL)
3rd Veldegem, Cyclo-cross (BEL)
2002
1st UCI Cyclo-cross World Championships
2nd General Classification World Cup, Cyclo-cross, Elite
1st Belgian National Cyclo-cross Championships
1st Diegem, Cyclo-cross (BEL)
2nd Eernegem Cyclocross (BEL)
2nd Hoogerheide, Cyclo-cross, Hoogerheide (NED)
2nd Nommay, Cyclo-cross, Nommay (FRA)
2nd Overijse, Cyclo-cross (BEL)
1st Schulteiss-Cup, Cyclo-cross (GER)
1st Sint-Niklaas, Cyclo-cross (BEL)
1st Baal, Cyclo-cross (BEL)
2nd Otegem, Cyclo-cross (BEL)
2nd Wetzikon, Cyclo-cross (SUI)
2nd Heerlen, Cyclo-cross (NED)
1st Eeklo, Cyclo-cross (BEL)
1st Boom, Derny (BEL)
3rd Ruddervoorde (BEL)
2nd Vichte (BEL)
1st Harderwijk, Cyclo-cross (NED)
2nd Fourmies/Val Joly, Cyclo-cross (FRA)
2nd Dottignies, Cyclo-cross (BEL)
3rd Hamme-Zogge, Cyclo-cross (BEL)
3rd Niel, Cyclo-cross (BEL)
2nd Gavere – Asper, Cyclo-cross (BEL)
2nd Frankfurt/Main, Cyclo-cross (GER)
1st Igorre, Cyclo-cross (ESP)
3rd Essen, Cyclo-cross (BEL)
2nd Kalmthout, Cyclo-cross (BEL)
1st Wortegem-Petegem, Cyclo-cross (BEL)
1st Veldegem, Cyclo-cross (BEL)
2003
3rd General Classification World Cup, Cyclo-cross, Elite
2nd UCI Cyclo-cross World Championships
3rd General Classification Superprestige, Cyclo-cross
2nd Diegem, Cyclo-cross (BEL)
2nd Overijse, Cyclo-cross (BEL)
1st Steinsel-Contern, Cyclo-cross (LUX)
1st Surhuisterveen Centrumcross (NED)
2nd Baal, Cyclo-cross (BEL)
2nd Wetzikon, Cyclo-cross (SUI)
1st 's Gravenwezel (BEL)
3rd Zolder, Cyclo-cross, Zolder (BEL)
2nd Harderwijk, Cyclo-cross (NED)
3rd Vossem, Cyclo-cross (BEL)
1st Châteaubernard, Cyclo-cross (FRA)
1st Frankfurt/Main, Cyclo-cross (GER)
1st Hamme-Zogge, Cyclo-cross (BEL)
1st Zeddam, Cyclo-cross (NED)
1st Eymouthiers, Cyclo-cross (FRA)
2004
2nd UCI Cyclo-cross World Championships
2nd Belgian National Cyclo-cross Championships
1st Pétange, Cyclo-cross (LUX)
2nd Surhuisterveen Centrumcross (NED)
1st Hoogerheide, Cyclo-cross, Hoogerheide (NED)
1st Lanarvily, Cyclo-cross, Lanarvily (FRA)
3rd Eeklo, Cyclo-cross (BEL)
3rd GP de Eecloonaar, Eeklo (BEL)
2nd Oostmalle, Cyclo-cross (BEL)
1st Ruddervoorde (BEL)
2nd Ninove (b) (BEL)
1st Westrozebeke (BEL)
3rd Wortegem-Petegem, Cyclo-cross, Wortegem-Petegem (BEL)
2nd Dottignies, Cyclo-cross (BEL)
3rd Holé Vrchy, Cyclo-cross (CZE)
1st Frankfurt/Main, Cyclo-cross (GER)
1st Hamburg, Cyclo-cross (GER)
2nd Dagmersellen, Cyclo-cross (SUI)
1st Veldegem, Cyclo-cross (BEL)

== See also ==
- List of doping cases in cycling
