= Gerben de Knegt =

Cyclo-cross cyclist (born 1975)

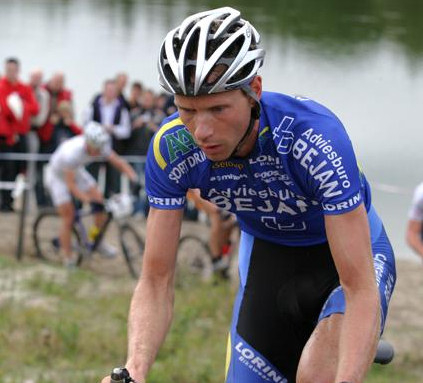
- Gerben de Knegt in 2008

Personal information
- Born: 11 December 1975 (age 50) Tilburg, North Brabant, Netherlands
- Height: 1.9 m (6 ft 3 in)
- Weight: 76 kg (168 lb)

Cycling career
- Sport: Cycling
- Current team: Retired
- Discipline: Road
- Role: Rider
- Rider type: Cyclo-cross; Road; Mountain bike

Professional teams
- 2000–2001: Rabobank
- 2002–2010: Rabobank GS3
- 2011–2013: Rabobank–Giant Off-Road Team

Gerben de Knegt (born 11 December 1975) is a former professional cyclo-cross racing cyclist and mountain biker from the Netherlands. He was born in Tilburg, North Brabant.

== Major results ==
2001–2002
1st National Cyclo-cross Championships
1st Centrumcross Surhuisterveen
2004
1st Stages 1 & 2, TransAlp Challenge
2005–2006
1st National Cyclo-cross Championships
1st Sluitingsprijs Oostmalle, GvA Trofee
1st Diegem, Superprestige
1st Cyclo-cross international de Marle
2006–2007
1st Grand Prix van Hasselt, GvA Trofee
2009–2010
1st Centrumcross Surhuisterveen
1st Ciclocross del Ponte
2010–2011
2nd National Cyclo-cross Championships
2011–2012
1st Centrumcross Surhuisterveen
