= Daphny van den Brand =

Dutch cyclist

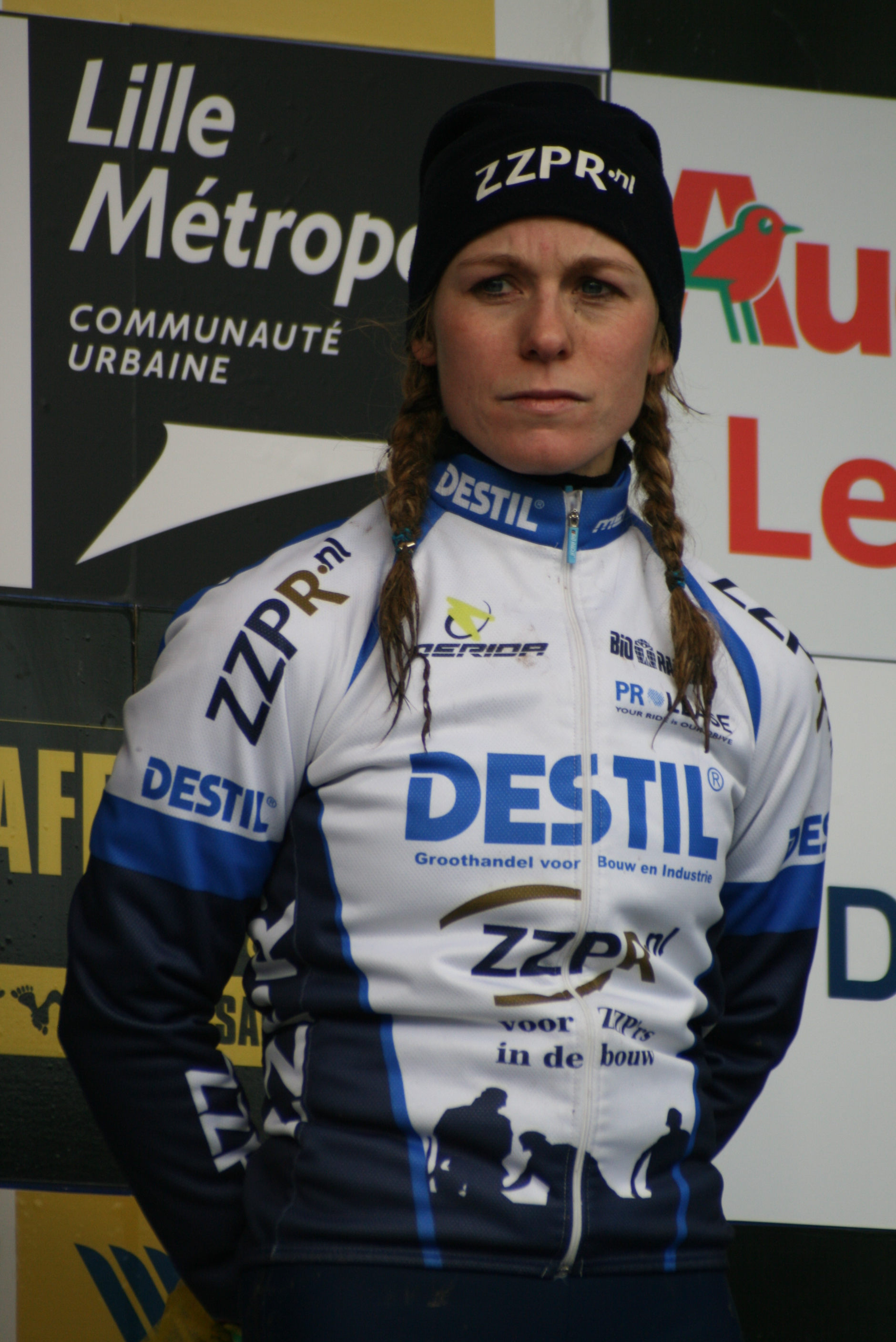

Personal information
- Full name: Daphny van den Brand
- Born: 6 April 1978 (age 48) Zeeland, North Brabant, Netherlands
- Height: 1.58 m (5 ft 2 in)
- Weight: 51 kg (112 lb)

Cycling career
- Sport: Cycling
- Discipline: Cyclo-cross
- Role: Rider

Professional teams
- 2000: Kupfernagel
- 2003–2004: @Home
- 2005: Van Bemmelen - AA Drink

Major wins
- Cyclo-cross World Championships (2003) European Championships (2006, 2007, 2010, 2011) National Championships (1998–2003, 2005–2007, 2009, 2010) Mountain bike National Championships (2002)
Medal record
Representing the Netherlands
Women's Cyclo-cross
World Championship
Gold medal – first place	2003 Monopoli	Elite
Silver medal – second place	2012 Koksijde	Elite
Bronze medal – third place	2000 Sint-Michielsgestel	Elite
Bronze medal – third place	2001 Tábor	Elite
Bronze medal – third place	2002 Zolder	Elite
Bronze medal – third place	2006 Zeddam	Elite
Bronze medal – third place	2010 Tábor	Elite
European Championship
Gold medal – first place	2010 Hoogstraten	Elite
Gold medal – first place	2007 Hittnau	Elite
Gold medal – first place	2006 Huijbergen	Elite
Silver medal – second place	2005 Pontchateau	Elite

Daphny van den Brand (born 6 April 1978 in Zeeland, North Brabant) is a Dutch cyclo-cross, road bicycle and mountain bike racer.

Daphny van den Brand started her cycling at eight. She won races thanks to her sprint.

Van den Brand joined the Dutch junior team. She won her first medal as a junior in 1993 during the cyclo-cross race in Sint-Michielsgestel, where she finished third .

Dutch mountain bike manager Leo van Zeeland asked her in 1994 to race on a mountain bike. Van den Brand took part in a race in Bergschenhoek and finished in fifth position. She rode in the European and world junior mountain biking championships and finished seventh.

Van den Brand then concentrated on mountain biking and cyclo-cross. She won eight national cyclo-cross championships and the cyclo-cross world championship 2003 in Monopoli. She also won four world bronze medals, a silver at the European championship 2005 and a gold at the 2006 UCI Cyclo-cross European Championships. In mountain biking she won a gold, a silver and a bronze medal in national championships between 2001 and 2003.

== Major results ==
1994–1995
3rd National Championships
1997–1998
1st National Championships
1st in Gieten
1998–1999
1st National Championships
1st in Gieten
1999–2000
1st National Championships
1st in Gieten
2000–2001
1st National Championships
1st in Gieten
3rd in World Championship Cyclo-cross
2001–2002
1st National Championships
1st in Gieten
3rd in World Championship Cyclo-cross
2002–2003
1st National Championships
2nd in Dutch National Championship Mountain bike
3rd in World Championship Cyclo-cross
1st in Hoogerheide
2003–2004
1st UCI World Championships
2nd National Championships
3rd in Dutch National Championship Mountain bike
1st in Hoogerheide
1st in Turin
1st in Vossem
1st in Kalmthout
2004–2005
2nd National Championships
1st in Netherlands National championship mountain bike
1st in Oostmalle
1st in Pijnacker-Nootdorp
1st in Milan
1st in Kalmthout
1st in Overijse
1st in Loenhout
2005–2006
1st National Championships
1st in Hamburg
1st in Kalmthout
1st in Sint-Michielsgestel
1st in Koppenberg
2nd UEC European Championships
1st in Pijnacker-Nootdorp
1st in Milan
1st in Hofstade
1st in Hooglede
2006–2007
1st UEC European Championships
1st National Championships
1st in Liévin
1st in Hoogerheide
3rd in World championship cyclo-cross
1st in Oostmalle
1st in Harderwijk
1st in Frankfurt
1st in Overijse
1st in Veghel-Eerde
2007–2008
1st UEC European Championships
1st National Championships
2009–2010
2nd in UCI Cyclo-cross World Cup, Treviso (ITA)
2010–2011
1st UEC European Championships
2nd National Championships
2011–2012
1st UEC European Championships
2nd National Championships
