= Sanne Cant =

Belgian cyclist (born 1990)

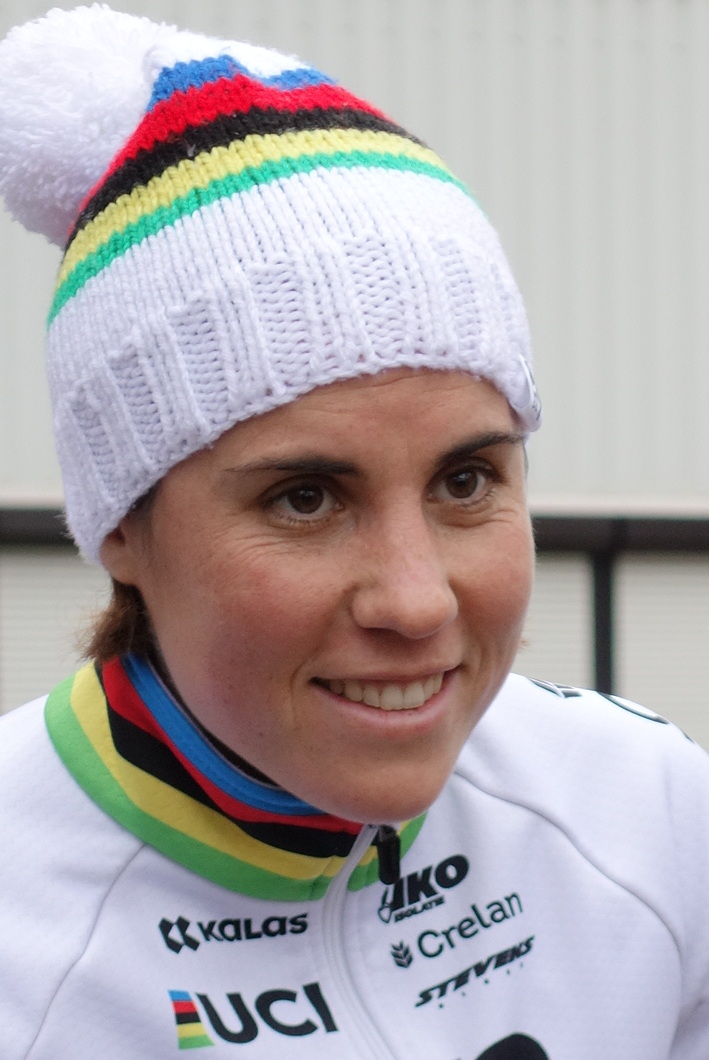
- Cant in 2020.

Personal information
- Full name: Sanne Cant
- Born: 8 October 1990 (age 36) Antwerp, Belgium

Cycling career
- Sport: Cycling
- Disciplines: Cyclo-cross; Mountain biking; Road
- Role: Rider

Professional teams
- 2008: Guerciotti–Selle Italia
- 2009–2018: Enertherm–BKCP
- 2018–2019: Corendon–Circus
- 2019–2025: IKO–Crelan (cyclo-cross)
- 2020–2025: Ciclismo Mundial (road)

Major wins
- Cyclo-cross World Championships (2017–2019) European Championships (2014, 2015, 2017) National Championships (2010–2023) World Cup (2014–15, 2015–16, 2017–18) 12 individual wins (2014–15—2017–18) Trophy (2010–11, 2012–13, 2013–14, 2015–16, 2016–17, 2018–19)
Medal record
Women's cyclo-cross
Representing Belgium
World Championships
Gold medal – first place	2017 Bieles	Elite
Gold medal – first place	2018 Valkenburg	Elite
Gold medal – first place	2019 Bogense	Elite
Silver medal – second place	2015 Tábor	Elite
Bronze medal – third place	2012 Koksijde	Elite
Bronze medal – third place	2016 Heusden-Zolder	Elite
Bronze medal – third place	2024 Tábor	Team relay
European Championships
Gold medal – first place	2014 Lorsch	Elite
Gold medal – first place	2015 Huijbergen	Elite
Gold medal – first place	2017 Tabor	Elite

Sanne Cant (born 8 October 1990) is a Belgian former racing cyclist, who last competed in cyclo-cross for UCI Cyclo-cross Crelan–Corendon, and in road cycling for UCI Women's Continental Team Fenix–Premier Tech. Cant's cousin Loes Sels is also a professional cyclist.

Cant won the World Championship cyclo cross in the elite category in 2017, 2018, 2019, and won the European Cyclo-cross Championship in 2014, 2015 and 2017.

== Career ==
=== Competing at youth level ===
In her youth Cant competed in both athletics and duathlon. In 2002, she started cycling, focusing mainly on cyclocross and mountain biking. In her first year as a cyclist she immediately won the provincial championship at the age of 12. In 2003 and 2004, she repeated this feat. Also in 2004, Cant achieved her first major victory, becoming Belgian champion in the 14-year-old category. She then moved into the youth category, continuing her provincial title run, while also capturing the youth MTB title. In 2006, the expectations were high, and she won another provincial title as well as her first national title.

=== First professional years ===
Her first professional year was the 2008–2009 season, riding for the Italian Guerciotti-Selle Italia team. Her first podium in a major competition came with 3rd place during the cyclo-cross from Gavere. A month later, she recorded her first victory in the race in Faè di Oderzo. From 1 January 2009, Cant signed with BKCP-Powerplus, the team of Niels Albert.

In preparation for the 2009–2010 season she rode various MTB races, again winning the Belgian championship. The subsequent cyclocross season started well for Cant. She was 4th in the Citadel Cross. Later that season, she won the Belgian cyclo-cross championship.

For the summer season of 2010 Cant decided not to be restricted to mountain bike races and focussed solely on the road. Again, she won the Belgian national cyclo-cross championships.

During the summer of 2011 Cant signed a contract with the Young Telenet-Fidea team, despite the signed contract extension Cant at BKCP-Powerplus. In September 2013 she was awarded a fine of 30,000 euros from the UCI. She rode consistently that season, with her best results being her two 2nd places in the Scheldecross and the Grapes Cross. In January 2012 she took a 3rd Belgian title as well as the bronze at the World Championships at home in Koksijde.

=== Breakthrough season ===
In preparation for the 2012–2013 season Cant decided to compete in mountain biking alongside road races. This cyclocross season saw Cant's breakthrough. She started with a number of victories, she won in Kalmthout and in Zonhoven. She continued her momentum and won in Leuven, Essen and Loenhout. During the Roubaix world cup race Cant fell heavily on a muddy descent with American racer Katherine Compton. Cant was taken to the hospital, where it turned out that she had no serious injuries. On 13 January, she won her fourth consecutive Belgian championship. After the World championships Cant won several competitions such, Hoogstraten, Oostmalle and even the best in the general classification in the Bpost bank trophy.

=== Breakthrough confirmation ===
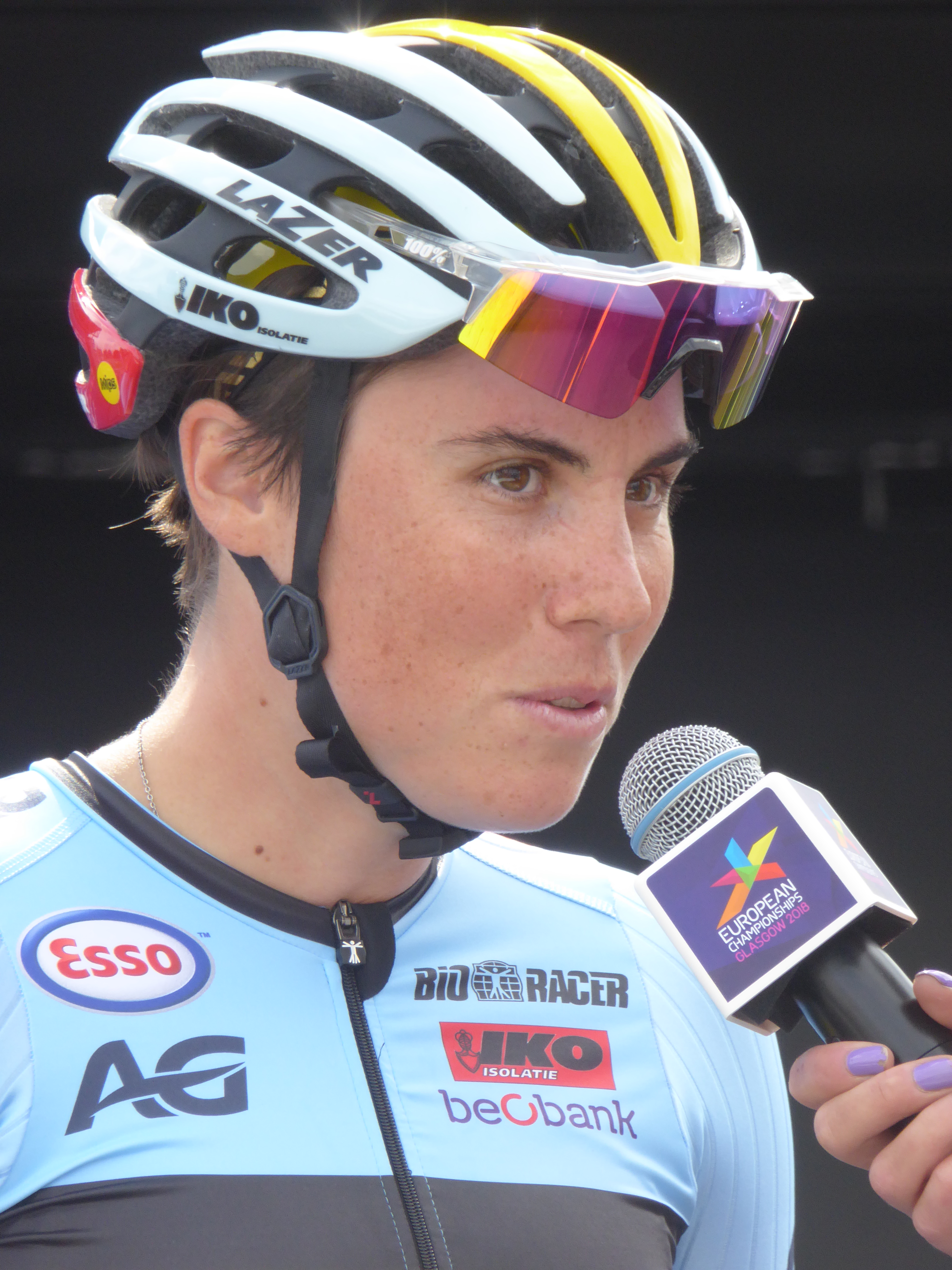
Cant at the 2018 European Road Cycling Championships

After the 2012–2013 season Cant combined road cycling with cyclo-cross. She finished 7th at the Belgian road championships and took silver for the second time at the Belgian mountain bike championships. Cant's winter began two weeks earlier than normal. She rode and won the Supercross Baden in Switzerland. Two weeks later she won the Grand Prix Neerpelt then also won in Laarne. In November she won the Fair Cross Niel, the GP Hasselt and Cyclocross Asper-Gavere. In early 2014 she again became national champion for the fifth time in a row.

=== Career season ===
Her preparation for the winter of 2014–2015 contrasted to recent years. She started erratically, but in November she showcased her great form winning the Superprestiege of Zonhoven and her first European title. She went on to record her first victory in the World Cup. A week later she won the Milton Keynes round. With this win, she was the first Belgian ever to lead the World Cup. She also led the UCI Rankings. In January she extended her national title winning run.

The summer of 2015 began with Cant being selected to the national road team. Before the start of the 2015–2016 season Cant said she would contest fewer races with the aim of being fresher in the World championships. Her season started with a third place during the first World Cup round. This was followed by two victories in the Superprestige, where for the first time in its history, a final ranking overall classification for women would be decided. Her first big goal of the season was to defend the European Championship – a goal she was successful in.

In January 2017 she became world champion cyclo-cross and in October 2017 she gained her third European title. On 26 December 2017 Cant won in Heusden-Zolder her 100th victory in the cyclo-cross. On 3 February 2018 Cant won a second world championship. On 2 February 2019 she scored a hattrick by winning the world championship three years in a row.

== Major results ==
=== Cyclo-cross ===
2006–2007
1st National Junior Championships
2007–2008
1st National Junior Championships
2008–2009
1st National Junior Championships
1st Faè di Oderzo
2009–2010
1st National Championships
2010–2011
1st National Championships
Gazet van Antwerpen Trofee

1st Lille

2011–2012
1st National Championships
2012–2013
1st National Championships
BPost Bank Trophy

1st Essen
1st Loenhout
1st Oostmalle

1st Hoogstraten
1st Middelkerke
1st Kalmthout
1st Zonhoven
1st Leuven
2013–2014
1st National Championships
BPost Bank Trophy

1st Hasselt
1st Essen
1st Lille
1st Oostmalle

Soudal Classics

1st Niel
1st Neerpelt

1st Gavere–Asper
1st Kalmthout
1st Diegem
1st Baden
2014–2015
1st UEC European Championships
1st National Championships
1st Overall UCI World Cup

1st Koksijde
1st Milton Keynes
1st Lignières-en-Berry

Superprestige

1st Gieten
1st Zonhoven
1st Ruddervoorde
1st Gavere
1st Hoogstraten

BPost Bank Trophy

1st Hamme
1st Hasselt
1st Lille
1st Antwerpen

1st Neerpelt
1st Niel
1st Overijse
1st Sint-Niklaas
1st Otegem
1st Oostmalle
1st Eeklo
1st Maldegem
1st Heerlen
2nd UCI World Championships
2015–2016
1st UEC European Championships
1st National Championships
1st Overall UCI World Cup

1st Koksijde
1st Heusden-Zolder
1st Lignières-en-Berry

1st Overall Superprestige

1st Gieten
1st Zonhoven
1st Ruddervoorde
1st Gavere
1st Hoogstraten
1st Middelkerke

1st Overall BPost Bank Trophy

1st Essen
1st Antwerpen
1st Loenhout
1st Baal

1st Niel
1st Hasselt
1st Maldegem
1st Eeklo
1st Oostmalle
3rd UCI World Championships
2016–2017
1st UCI World Championships
1st National Championships
1st Overall Superprestige

1st Gieten
1st Zonhoven
1st Gavere
1st Middelkerke

1st Overall DVV Trofee

1st Hamme
1st Essen
1st Antwerpen
1st Loenhout

UCI World Cup

1st Zeven

Brico Cross

1st Geraardsbergen
1st Hulst

1st Ardooie
1st Hasselt
1st Mol
1st Niel
1st Oostmalle
1st Sint-Niklaas
2017–2018
1st UCI World Championships
1st UEC European Championships
1st National Championships
1st Overall UCI World Cup

1st Waterloo
1st Bogense
1st Zeven
1st Heusden-Zolder
1st Hoogerheide

1st Superprestige

1st Diegem
1st Hoogstraten
1st Middelkerke

DVV Trofee

1st Hamme
1st Essen
1st Antwerpen
1st Loenhout
1st Lille

Brico Cross

1st Eeklo
1st Meulebeke

1st Lebbeke
1st Otegem
2018–2019
1st UCI World Championships
1st National Championships
1st Overall Superprestige

1st Zonhoven
1st Diegem
1st Hoogstraten

1st Overall DVV Trofee

1st Niel
1st Lille

Brico Cross

1st Meulebeke
1st Lokeren

1st Mol
1st Sint-Niklaas
2019–2020
1st National Championships
Ethias Cross

1st Bredene

1st Sint-Niklaas
2020–2021
1st National Championships
2021–2022
1st National Championships
Ethias Cross

1st Meulebeke

2022–2023
1st National Championships
2023–2024
1st National Championships
Ethias Cross

1st Loenhout

2024–2025
1st Otegem

=== Mountain bike ===
2006
1st Cross-country, National Junior Championships
2007
1st Cross-country, National Junior Championships
2008
1st Cross-country, National Junior Championships
1st Tubize
1st Langdorp

=== Road ===
2018
3rd Road race, National Championships
2024
1st Schaal Sels Ladies
2nd Road race, National Championships
