= Arenda Grimberg =

Dutch cyclist

Personal information
- Born: 10 March 1978 (age 48) Netherlands

Cycling career
- Sport: Cycling
- Disciplines: Road cycling, Cyclo-cross

Professional teams
- 2006-2008: Odysis
- 2009-2010: Merida Cycling Team

Arenda Grimberg (born 10 March 1978) is a Dutch racing cyclist born in Almelo. She participates in both road cycling as cyclo-cross. In 2002, she became Dutch national champion in road racing. She represented her nation at the 1999, 2000, 2001, 2002, 2003, 2004 and 2005 UCI Road World Championships.

== Honours ==
=== Road cycling ===
- 1998 : 3rd in Damesronde van Drenthe
- 2002 : 1st in Dutch Elite National Championships
- 2003 : 3rd in Ronde van Gelderland
- 2004 : 3rd in Ronde van Gelderland
- 2004 : 3rd in Holland Hills Classic
- 2005 : 3rd in Omloop Door Middag-Humsterland
- 2005 : 3rd in Holland Hills Classic
- 2008 & 2010 : 1st Profronde van Almelo

=== Cyclo-cross ===
- 2004 : 3rd in Gieten
- 2005 : 3rd in Sint-Michielsgestel
- 2006 : 1st in Sint-Michielsgestel (2006/07 Cyclo-cross Superprestige)
