= Reza Hormes-Ravenstijn =

Dutch cyclist (born 1967)

Reza Ravenstijn
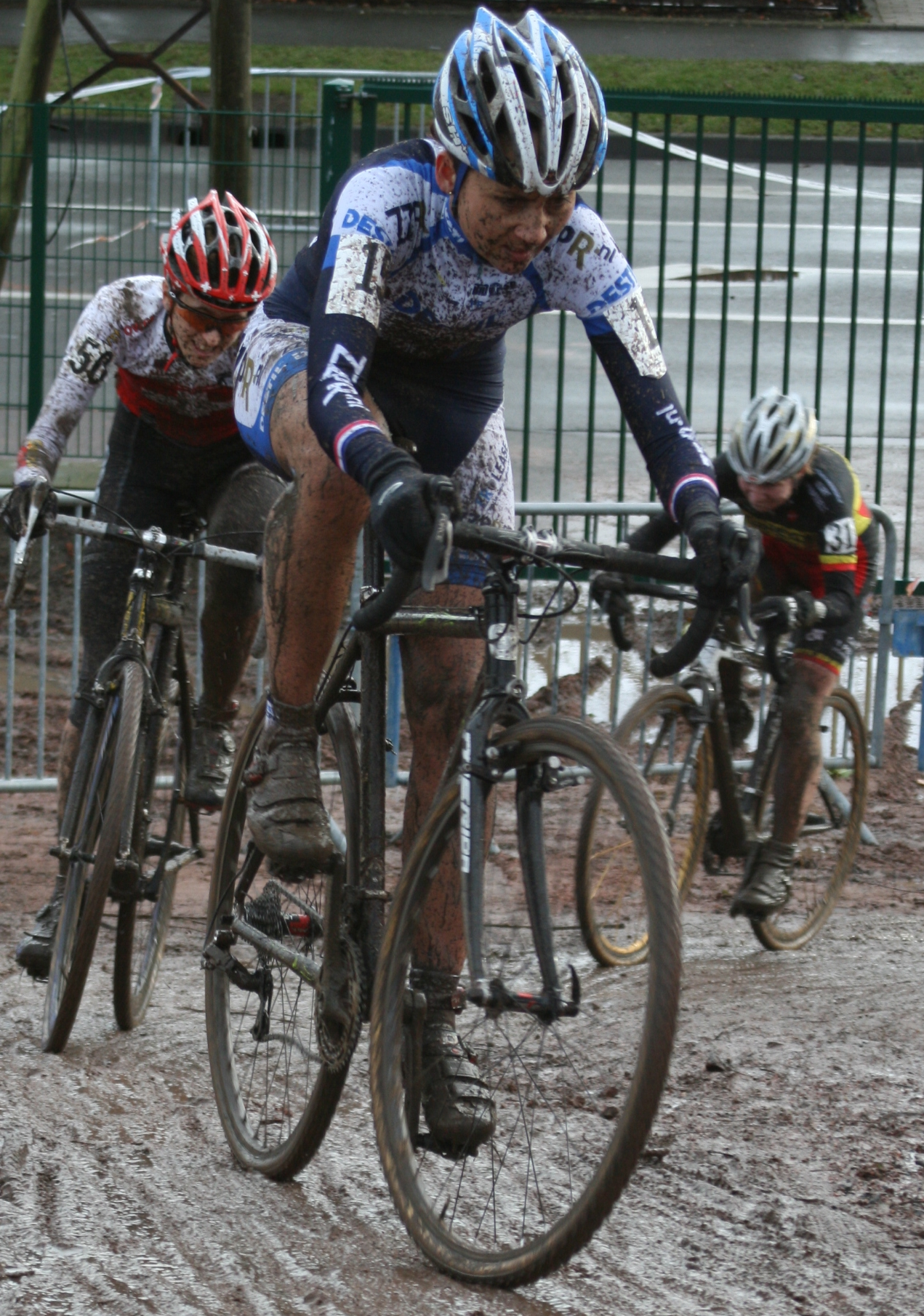

Personal information
- Full name: Reza Ravenstijn
- Born: 6 February 1967 (age 59) Beek, the Netherlands
- Height: 1.72 m (5 ft 8 in)

Cycling career
- Sport: Cycling
- Discipline: Cyclo-cross
- Role: Rider

Major wins
- (Netherlands) National Cyclo-cross Champion (1995) Gieten Cyclo-cross (1996, 2002, 2003); Hoogerheide Cyclo-cross (2004); Huijbergen Cyclo-cross (2004) Lille Cyclo-cross (2006)

Reza Hormes-Ravenstijn, (born 6 February 1967 in Beek (Ubbergen)) is a Dutch cyclo-cross racer. She won seven races during her career, including the Dutch National Cyclo-cross Championship in 1995. During other Dutch Nationals she won two silver and two bronze medals.

== Achievements ==
- 1st in Dutch National Championship Cycle-cross (1995)
- 2nd in Dutch National Championship Cycle-cross (1997, 1998)
- 3rd in Dutch National Championship Cycle-cross (1996, 2006)
- 1st in Cyclo-cross race in Gieten (1996, 2002, 2003)
- 1st in Cyclo-cross race in Hoogerheide (2004)
- 1st in Cyclo-cross race in Huijbergen (2004)
- 1st in Cyclo-cross race in Lille (2006)
- 1st in Cyclo-cross race in Cyclo-cross Gazet van Antwerpen (Oudenaarde)
- 1st in Cyclo-cross race in Cyclo-cross Gazet van Antwerpen (Lille)
- 1st in Cyclo-cross race in Cyclo-cross Gazet van Antwerpen (Oostmalle)
