= Loes Sels =

Belgian cyclist

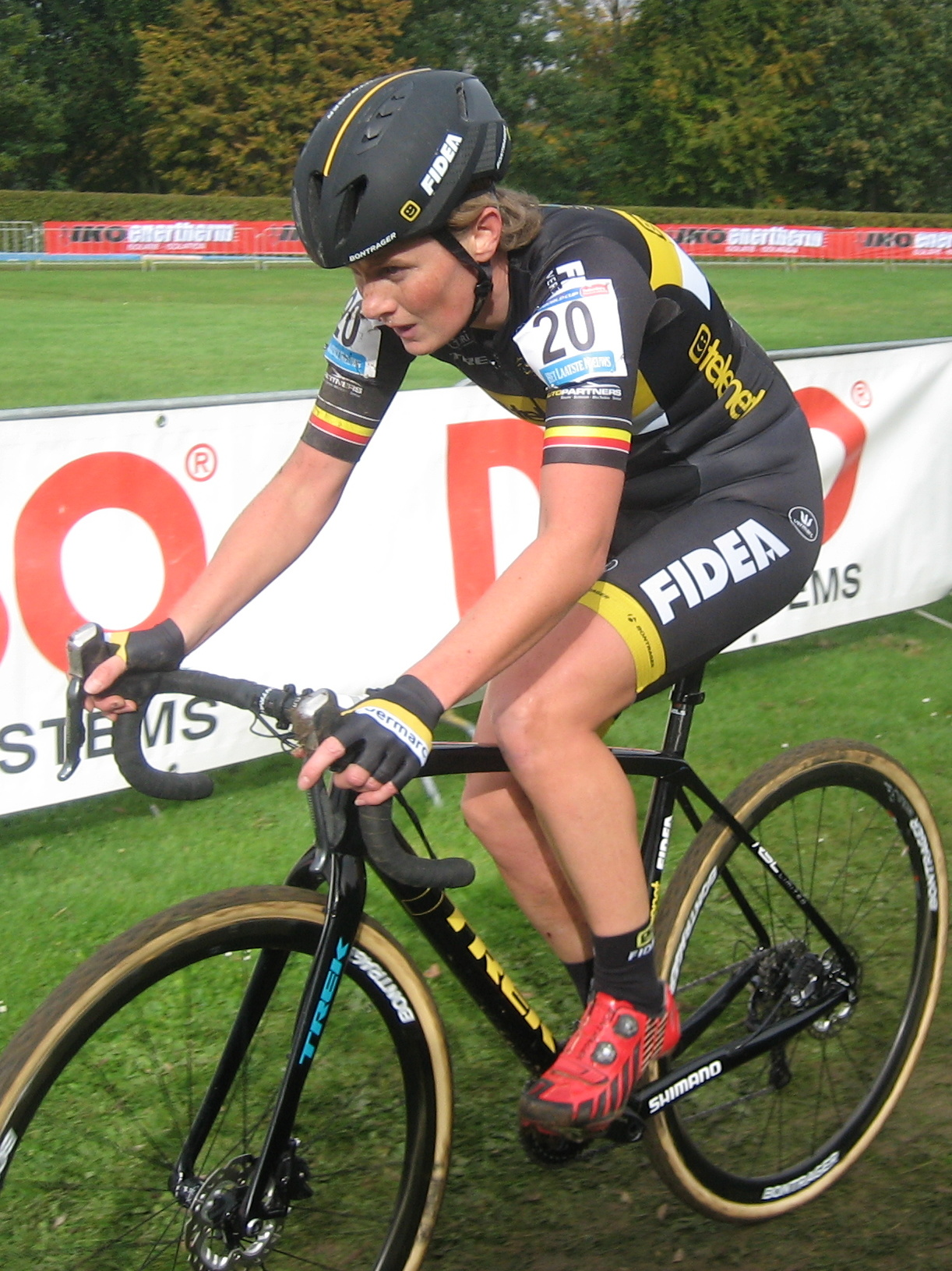
- Sels in the 2016 Cauberg Cyclo-cross

Personal information
- Full name: Loes Sels
- Born: 25 July 1985 (age 41)

Cycling career
- Sport: Cycling
- Current team: IKO–Crelan
- Disciplines: Cyclo-cross; Road
- Role: Rider

Amateur teams
- 2013–2016: Young Telenet–Fidea
- 2017: Kalas–H. Essers–NNOF
- 2017–2018: Crelan–Charles

Professional teams
- 2005–2009: Vlaanderen–Capri Sonne–T Interim
- 2018–2019: Pauwels Sauzen–Vastgoedservice
- 2019–: IKO–Crelan
- 2020: Ciclismo Mundial (road)

Loes Sels (born 25 July 1985) is a Belgian cyclist, who currently competes in cyclo-cross for UCI Cyclo-cross Team IKO–Crelan. She represented her nation in the women's elite event at the 2016 UCI Cyclo-cross World Championships in Heusden-Zolder. Sels was Belgian cyclo-cross champion in the elite category (2007, 2008). Sels' cousin Sanne Cant is also a professional cyclist.
