= French National Cyclo-cross Championships =

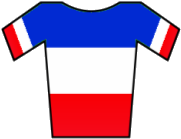
The champion's jersey

The French National Cyclo-cross Championships is a cycling race that is held to decide the best French cyclist in the cyclo-cross discipline. The first edition took place in 1902.

== Men ==
=== Elite ===
Year	Gold	Silver	Bronze	Location
1902	Fernand De Baeder	Henri Vazieux	Henri Roques	
1903	Robert Seigneur	Enrico Fouquier	Louis Rigoust	
1905	Pierre Frere	Eugène Christophe	Louis Rigoust	
1906	Henri-Pierre Dupont	Jean Devoissoux	Chevret	
1907	Octave Lapize	Lucien Pages	Fox	
1908	Marcel Baumler	Lucien Pages	Gilbert Stoeffel	
1909	Eugène Christophe	Antoine d'Annunzio	Maurice Laine	
1910	Eugène Christophe	Georges Tribouillard	Massicot	
1911	Eugène Christophe	Georges Tribouillard	Aldo Bettini	Suresnes
1912	Eugène Christophe	Julien Loisel	Lucien Pages	
1913	Eugène Christophe	Gommaire Jobin	Julien Loisel	
1914	Eugène Christophe	Francis Pélissier	Georges Gatier	
1920	Gaston Degy	Eugène Christophe	Honoré Barthélémy	
1921	Eugène Christophe	Charles Lacquehay	Roger Lacolle	
1922	Roger Lacolle	Gaston Degy	Eugène Christophe	
1923	Roger Lacolle	Eugène Christophe	Marcel Vincent	
1924	Fernand Lemay	Gaston Degy	Fernand Dubourg	Melun
1925	Alexandre Piveteau	Antoine Peyrard	Clément Vottier	Melun
1926	Charles Pélissier	Roger Lacolle	Alexandre Piveteau	
1927	Charles Pélissier	Paul Le Drogo	Camille Foucaux	Melun
1928	Charles Pélissier	Camille Foucaux	Auguste Segaud	
1929	Camille Foucaux	Auguste Segaud	Marcel Mazeyrat	
1930	Camille Foucaux	Henri Deconninck	Aubert Winsingues	
1931	Camille Foucaux	Henri Deconninck	André Vanderdonckt	
1932	Camille Foucaux	Aubert Winsingues	Marcel Duc	
1933	André Vanderdonckt	Théodore Ladron	Auguste Segaud	
1934	Charles Vaast	Léon Maillard	Robert Laforgue	
1935	Robert Laforgue	Georges Peuziat	Jean Colotte	Fontainebleau
1936	Paul Chocque	François Guilhaire	Robert Oubron	
1937	Georges Peuziat	Robert Oubron	Charles Vaast	Fontainebleau
1938	Paul Chocque	Maurice Cacheux	Ludovic Bulteau	
1939	Robert Laforgue	Charles Vaast	Marcel Duc	Fontainebleau
1941	Robert Oubron	Georges Peuziat	Kléber Piot	Marnes-la-Coquette
1941 (a)	Gino Proietti	Jules Rougemont	Marius Nanni	Bron
1942 (b)	Robert Oubron	Albert Carapezzi	Georges Peuziat	Marnes-la-Coquette
1942 (a)	Gino Proietti	Jules Stellon	Roger Pierredon	Marseille
1943	Robert Oubron	Robert Dorgebray	Marcel Duc	Toulouse
1944	Robert Oubron	Kléber Piot	Victor Cosson	Fontainebleau
1945	Jean Robic	Kléber Piot	Roger Rondeaux	Fontainebleau
1946	Robert Oubron	Kléber Piot	Georges Ramoulux	Fontainebleau
1947	Roger Rondeaux	Pierre Jodet	Vincent Ceci	Fontainebleau
1948	Roger Rondeaux	Pierre Jodet	Robert Oubron	Charbonnières-les-Bains
1949	Roger Rondeaux	Georges Ramoulux	Robert Oubron	Nancy
1950	Pierre Jodet	Georges Meunier	Kléber Piot	Fontainebleau
1951	Roger Rondeaux	André Dufraisse	Georges Meunier	Marsannay-la-Côte
1952	Roger Rondeaux	Antonin Canavese	André Dufraisse	Limoges
1953	Roger Rondeaux	Gilbert Bauvin	Antonin Canavese	Besançon
1954	Roger Rondeaux	Pierre Jodet	André Dufraisse	La Baule
1955	André Dufraisse	Gérard Durand	Roger Rondeaux	Calais
1956	André Dufraisse	Georges Meunier	Pierre Jodet	Dreux
1957	Georges Meunier	Pierre Jodet	André Dufraisse	Bourges
1958	André Dufraisse	André Brûlé	Georges Meunier	Calais
1959	André Dufraisse	André Brûlé	Georges Meunier	Saint-Fons
1960	Georges Meunier	Robert Aubry	Jean Gérardin	Poitiers
1961	André Dufraisse	Jean Gérardin	André Gandolfo	Vihiers
1962	André Dufraisse	Maurice Gandolfo	Bernard Vattier	Lurbe-Saint-Christau
1963	André Dufraisse	André Gandolfo	Pierre Bernet	Cesson
1964	Michel Pelchat	Pierre Bernet	Jean Gérardin	Le Bec-Hellouin
1965	Pierre Bernet	André Gandolfo	Jules Leclercq	Aiglemont
1966	Michel Pelchat	Pierre Bernet	Joseph Mahé	Labatut
1967	Jean-Pierre Ducasse	Pierre Bernet	André Bayssière	Épernay
1968	Jean-Pierre Ducasse	Luc Evrard	Michel Pelchat	Josselin
1969	James Herbain	Pierre Bernet	Jean-Paul Weibel	Sarrebourg
1970	Pierre Bernet	Walter Ricci	James Herbain	Le Havre
1971	Jean-Michel Richeux	Alex Gerardin	Pierre Bernet	Saint-Junien
1972	Jean-Michel Richeux	Pierre Bernet	André Wilhelm	Saint-Leu-d'Esserent
1973	André Wilhelm	Pierre Bernet	Jean-Yves Plaisance	Lanarvily
1974	André Wilhelm	Alex Gerardin	Pierre Bernet	Kaysersberg
1975	Alex Gerardin	Walter Ricci	Gilbert Lahalle	Saint-Simeux
1976	Cyrille Guimard	Jean-Yves Plaisance	Alex Gerardin	Chazay-d'Azergues
1977	Alex Gerardin	Robert Alban	Jean-Yves Plaisance	Lapugnoy
1978	Jean-Yves Plaisance	Jean Chassang	Pierre-Raymond Villemiane	Pontchâteau
1979	André Wilhelm	Pierre-Raymond Villemiane	Jean Chassang	Porchefontaine
1980	Alex Gerardin	Robert Alban	Jacques Osmon	Langres
1981	Jean Chassang	Alex Gerardin	André Wilhelm	Cours-les-Barres
1982	Marc Madiot	Alex Gérardin	Pascal Poisson	Miramas
1983	Martial Gayant	Patrice Thévenard	Marc Madiot	Salies-de-Béarn
1984	Yvon Madiot	Martial Gayant	Marc Madiot	Reyrieux
1985	Yvon Madiot	Marc Madiot	Martial Gayant	La Chaussaire
1986	Martial Gayant	Yvon Madiot	Ronan Pensec	Fourmies
1987	Yvon Madiot	Christophe Lavainne	Martial Gayant	Camors
1988	Christophe Lavainne	Martial Gayant	Yvon Madiot	Munster
1989	Dominique Arnould	Martial Gayant	Christophe Lavainne	Tessé-la-Madeleine
1990	Christophe Lavainne	Dominique Arnould	Bruno Lebras	Cap d'Agde
1991	Bruno Lebras	David Pagnier	Daniel Maquet	Lunéville
1992	David Pagnier	Dominique Arnould	Emmanuel Magnien	Saint-Herblain
1993	Dominique Arnould	Emmanuel Magnien	David Pagnier	Montreuil
1994	Dominique Arnould	Cyrille Bonnand	David Pagnier	Sablé-sur-Sarthe
1995	Jérôme Chiotti	David Pagnier	Emmanuel Magnien	Cublize
1996	Emmanuel Magnien	Jérôme Chiotti	Patrice Halgand	Lanarvily
1997	Christophe Mengin	David Pagnier	Dominique Arnould	Harnes
1998	Christophe Mengin	Dominique Arnould	Emmanuel Magnien	Nommay
1999	Christophe Morel	Emmanuel Magnien	Sébastien Loigerot	Pontchâteau
2000	Christophe Morel	Dominique Arnould	Miguel Martinez	Manosque
2001	David Pagnier	Cyrille Bonnand	Miguel Martinez	Blaye
2002	Dominique Arnould	David Derepas	John Gadret	Sarrebourg
2003	Dominique Arnould	John Gadret	Arnaud Labbe	Nommay
2004	John Gadret	Arnaud Labbe	Christophe Morel	Limoges
2005	Francis Mourey	John Gadret	Arnaud Labbe	Liévin
2006	John Gadret	Francis Mourey	Arnaud Labbe	Sedan
2007	Francis Mourey	John Gadret	Jérôme Chevallier	Lanarvily
2008	Francis Mourey	John Gadret	Arnaud Labbe	Pontchâteau
2009	Francis Mourey	Steve Chainel	Julien Belgy	Pontchâteau
2010	Francis Mourey	Steve Chainel	Nicolas Bazin	Liévin
2011	Francis Mourey	John Gadret	Arnold Jeannesson	Lanarvily
2012	Aurélien Duval	Steve Chainel	Francis Mourey	Quelneuc
2013	Francis Mourey	Arnold Jeannesson	John Gadret	Nommay
2014	Francis Mourey	Fabien Canal	Nicolas Bazin	Lignières
2015	Clément Lhotellerie	Clément Venturini	Francis Mourey	Pontchâteau
2016	Francis Mourey	Clément Venturini	John Gadret	Besançon
2017	Clément Venturini	Arnold Jeannesson	John Gadret	Lanarvily
2018	Steve Chainel	Francis Mourey	Arnold Jeannesson	Quelneuc
2019	Clément Venturini	Fabien Canal	Francis Mourey	Besançon
2020	Clément Venturini	Joshua Dubau	Fabien Doubey	Flamanville
2021	Clément Venturini	Joshua Dubau	David Menut	Pontchâteau
2022	Joshua Dubau	Yan Gras	Fabien Doubey	Liévin
2023	Clément Venturini	Fabien Doubey	Joshua Dubau	Bagnoles-de-l'Orne
2024	Clément Venturini	Joshua Dubau	Théo Thomas	Camors
2025	Clément Venturini	Joshua Dubau	Fabien Doubey	Pontchâteau
2026	Joris Delbove	Martin Groslambert	Timothé Gabriel	Troyes

=== U23 ===
Year	Gold	Silver	Bronze
1987	Dominique Arnould	Gwénaël Guégan	Bruno Blangeois
1988	Christophe Mengin	Stéphane Piriac	Marc Meyer
1989	David Pagnier	Eddy Seigneur	Emmanuel Duez
1990	Cyriaque Duval	David Pagnier	José Jaurégui
1991	Emmanuel Magnien	Franck Laurance	Jérôme Chiotti
1992	Jérôme Chiotti	Régis Duros	Olivier Macedo
1993	David Lefèvre	Sébastien Loigerot	Christophe Morel
1994	Patrice Halgand	Sébastien Loigerot	Christophe Morel
1995	Patrice Halgand	Christophe Morel	Pascal Perrin
1996	Miguel Martinez	Laurent Lefèvre	Vincent Renault
1997	Christophe Morel	David Derepas	Gaël Moreau
1998	Miguel Martinez	David Derepas	Guillaume Benoist
1999	Guillaume Benoist	John Gadret	Thomas Lecuyer
2000	David Derepas	John Gadret	Jean-Baptiste Béraud
2001	Francis Mourey	Thomas Lecuyer	Julien Absalon
2002	Francis Mourey	David Boucher	Jean-Baptiste Béraud
2003	Fabien Bourly	Julien Belgy	Sébastien Minard
2004	Stéphane Belot	Julien Belgy	Romain Fondard
2005	Romain Villa	Steve Chainel	Julien Belgy
2006	Clément Lhotellerie	Florian Le Corre	Jonathan Lopez
2007	Romain Villa	Aurélien Duval	Arnold Jeannesson
2008	Aurélien Duval	Jonathan Lopez	Clément Bourgoin
2009	Arnaud Jouffroy	Matthieu Boulo	Guillaume Perrot
2010	Matthieu Boulo	Arnaud Jouffroy	Jérémy Grimal
2011	Matthieu Boulo	Camille Thominet	Freddie Guilloux
2012	Julian Alaphilippe	Kévin Bouvard	Clément Venturini
2013	Julian Alaphilippe	Clément Venturini	Jimmy Turgis
2014	Clément Venturini	David Menut	Fabien Doubey
2015	Fabien Doubey	Clément Russo	Victor Koretzky
2016	Clément Russo	Victor Koretzky	Lucas Dubau
2017	Tony Périou	Clément Russo	Joshua Dubau
2018	Lucas Dubau	Joshua Dubau	Maxime Bonsergent
2019	Antoine Benoist	Eddy Finé	Sandy Dujardin
2020	Antoine Benoist	Mickaël Crispin	Joris Delbove
2021	Antoine Huby	Joris Delbove	Florian Richard Andrade
2022	Romain Grégoire	Joris Delbove	Clément Alléno
2023	Martin Groslambert	Nathan Bommenel	Rémi Lelandais

=== Junior ===
Year	Gold	Silver	Bronze
1978	Thierry Casas	Francis Quessette	Philippe Casas
1979	Thierry Casas (2)	Roland Buch	Jean-Jacques Philipp
1980	Philippe Mertens	Laurent Cailleau	Bruno Lebras
1981	Eric Guillot	Gilles Sanders	Jean-Michel Ortiz
1982	Gilles Sanders	Philippe Casado	Jean-Michel Bourdeul
1983	Thierry Valette	Jean-Pierre Dutilleul	Didier Thueux
1984	Didier Thueux	Gwénaël Guégan	Dominique Arnould
1985	Didier Arbault	Dominique Arnould	Alain Hupel
1986	Claude Bonsergent	David Bathie	Jean-Luc Poder
1987	Cyriaque Duval	Lionel Ory	Franck Paslier
1988	Emmanuel Magnien	José Jaurégui	David Pagnier
1989	Emmanuel Magnien (2)	José Jaurégui	Jérôme Chiotti
1990	Jérôme Chiotti	Anthony Benbetka	Sébastien Medan
1991	Anthony Benbetka	Jérôme Delbove	Olivier Asmaker
1992	Jérôme Delbove	Pascal Perrin	Michel Wilhelm
1993	Miguel Martinez	Laurent Lefèvre	Christophe Morel
1994	Miguel Martinez (2)	Laurent Lefèvre	Stéphane Cougé
1995	Grégory Lapalud	Guillaume Benoist	Peter Pouly
1996	Gaël Moreau	David Derepas	Gregory Lapalud
1997	Nicolas Dieudonné	Lionel Calvez	John Gadret
1998	Romain Denhez	Julien Bertaut	Nicolas Martin
1999	Jean-Baptiste Beraud	Emmanuel Lahonta	Sébastien Da Silva
2000	Steve Chainel	Pierre-Bernard Vaillant	Fabrice Bost
2001	Julien Belgy	Pierre-Bernard Vaillant	Florent Collin
2002	Romain Villa	Fabien Pedemanaud	Adrien Delautre
2003	Clément Lhotellerie	Nicolas Belot	Jonathan Hivert
2004	Clément Lhotellerie (2)	Jonathan Lopez	Tony Huet
2005	Jules Chabanon	Guillaume Perrot	Romain Lejeune
2006	Aurélien Duval	Jules Chabanon	Nicolas Morel
2007	Arnaud Jouffroy	Thomas Girard	Matthieu Boulo
2008	Arnaud Jouffroy (2)	Clément Koretzky	Pierre Garson
2009	Alexandre Billon	Anthony Maldonado	Valentin Hadoux
2010	David Menut	Émilien Viennet	Julian Alaphilippe
2011	Fabien Doubey	Quentin Jaurégui	Kévin Bouvard
2012	Quentin Jaurégui	Romain Seigle	Victor Koretzky
2013	Clément Russo	Léo Vincent	Yan Gras
2014	Sébastien Havot	Hugo Pigeon	Florian Vidal
2015	Eddy Finé	Émile Canal	Alexis Bourmaud
2016	Maxime Gagnaire	Simon Lepoittevin-Dubost	Matthieu Legrand
2017	Maxime Bonsergent	Antoine Benoist	Nicolas Guillemin
2018	Benjamin Rivet	Théo Thomas	Anthony Courrière
2019	Antoine Huby	Théo Thomas	Ronan Auffret
2020	Ugo Ananie	Rémi Lelandais	Baptiste Vadic
2021	Nathan Bommenel	Lenny Martinez	Louis Sparfel
2022	Louka Lesueur	Léo Bisiaux	Romain Debord
2023	Léo Bisiaux	Fantin Gloux	Jules Simon

=== Novice ===
Year	Gold	Silver	Bronze
1996	Romain Denhez	Julien Bertaut	Jérôme Boeffard
1997	Ludovic Lanceleur	Thomas Degas	David Guidoux
1998	Grégory Bernard	Alexandre Gelon	Sébastien Minard
1999	Pierre Bernard Vaillant	Grégory Chaval	Mickaël Schmitt
2000	Romain Fondard	Jean-Eudes Demaret	Fabien Roulleau
2001	Romain Villa	Pierre Charre	Pierre Bouillet
2002	Olivier Sarrazin	Clément Lhotellerie	Arnaud Moreau
2003	Yannick Martinez	Olivier Sarrazin	Anthony Cailleau
2004	Geoffrey Lorrain	Yannick Martinez	Pierre Kieffer
2005	Romain Pinot	Glenn Le Queau	Freddie Guilloux
2006	Arnaud Jouffroy	Pierre Garson	Pascal Le Roux
2007	Pierre Garson	Valentin Hadoux	Émilien Viennet
2008	Émilien Viennet	Pierre-Henri Lecuisinier	Maxime Huygens
2009	Pierre-Henri Lecuisinier	Anthony Chamerat-Dumont	Kévin Bouvard
2010	Antony Chamerat-Dumont	Anthony Turgis	Anthony Morel
2011	Léo Vincent	Raphaël Gay	Yan Gras
2012	Anthony Kuentz	Lucas Dubau	Hugo Briatta
2013	Émile Canal	Joffrey Degueurce	Sandy Dujardin
2014	Mickaël Crispin	Thomas Bonnet	Simon Lepoittevin-Dubost
2015	Nicolas Guillemin	Maxime Bonsergent	Jérémy Montauban
2016	Thibault Valognes	Benjamin Rivet	Clément Melaye
2017	Antoine Huby	Alexandre Le Roux	Axel Laurance
2018	Florian Richard Andrade	Bastien Tronchon	Rémi Lelandais
2019	Pierrick Burnet	Pierre Gautherat	Paul Anchain
2020	Louka Lesueur	Pierre-Henry Basset	Corentin Lequet
2021	Jarod Egéa-Garcia	Paul Seixas	Jules Simon
2022	Paul Seixas	Aubin Sparfel	Louis Tanguy

=== Amateur ===
Year	Gold	Silver	Bronze
1979	Daniel Perret	Hilaire Desclos	Pierre-Yves Duzellier
1980	Jean-Yves Plaisance	Patrice Blanchardon	Jacques Orenga
1981	Jean-Yves Plaisance (2)	René Bleuze	Serge Dhont
1982	Bruno Lebras	Jean-Yves Plaisance	Patrice Blanchardon
1983	Daniel Perret (2)	Hilaire Desclos	Didier Martinez
1984	Pierre-Yves Duzellier	Gilles Dubuis	Serge Dhont
1985	Didier Martinez	Hilaire Desclos	Gilles Dubuis
1986	René Bleuze	Bruno Lebras	Daniel Maquet
1987	Laurent Cailleau	Alain Daniel	Gilles Dubuis
1988	Bruno Lebras	Laurent Cailleau	Didier Martinez
1989	Bruno Lebras (3)	Alain Daniel	Didier Arbault
1990	Alain Daniel	Thierry Casas	Stéphane Piriac

== Women ==
=== Elite ===
Year	Gold	Silver	Bronze
2000	Laurence Leboucher	Sandra Temporelli	Nadia Triquet-Claude
2001	Laurence Leboucher	Maryline Salvetat	Virginie Souchon
2002	Maryline Salvetat	Laurence Leboucher	Corinne Sempé
2003	Laurence Leboucher	Maryline Salvetat	Nadia Triquet-Claude
2004	Maryline Salvetat	Laurence Leboucher	Corinne Sempé
2005	Maryline Salvetat	Laurence Leboucher	Corinne Sempé
2006	Laurence Leboucher	Maryline Salvetat	Nadia Triquet-Claude
2007	Maryline Salvetat	Laurence Leboucher	Christel Ferrier-Bruneau
2008	Laurence Leboucher (5)	Maryline Salvetat	Christel Ferrier-Bruneau
2009	Maryline Salvetat (5)	Christel Ferrier-Bruneau	Caroline Mani
2010	Caroline Mani	Christel Ferrier-Bruneau	Pauline Ferrand-Prévot
2011	Caroline Mani (2)	Pauline Ferrand-Prévot	Christel Ferrier-Bruneau
2012	Lucie Chainel-Lefèvre	Pauline Ferrand-Prévot	Caroline Mani
2013	Lucie Chainel-Lefèvre (2)	Pauline Ferrand-Prévot	Christel Ferrier-Bruneau
2014	Pauline Ferrand-Prévot	Lucie Chainel-Lefèvre	Caroline Mani
2015	Pauline Ferrand-Prévot (2)	Caroline Mani	Lucie Chainel-Lefèvre
2016	Caroline Mani (3)	Laure Bouteloup	Marlène Morel-Petitgirard
2017	Caroline Mani (4)	Juliette Labous	Hélène Clauzel
2018	Pauline Ferrand-Prévot (3)	Caroline Mani	Marlène Petit
2019	Caroline Mani (5)	Marlène Petit	Marion Norbert-Riberolle
2020	Marion Norbert-Riberolle	Caroline Mani	Perrine Clauzel
2021	Amandine Fouquenet	Perrine Clauzel	Marion Norbert-Riberolle
2022	Line Burquier	Amandine Fouquenet	Olivia Onesti
2023	Hélène Clauzel	Line Burquier	Perrine Clauzel
2024	Hélène Clauzel	Amandine Fouquenet	Anaïs Morichon
2025	Amandine Fouquenet	Hélène Clauzel	Célia Gery
2026	Célia Gery	Amandine Fouquenet	Amandine Muller

=== U23 ===
Year	Gold	Silver	Bronze
2020	Marion Norbert-Riberolle	Léa Curinier	Laura Porhel
2021	Amandine Fouquenet	Marion Norbert-Riberolle	Lauriane Duraffourg
2022	Line Burquier	Amandine Fouquenet	Olivia Onesti
2023	Line Burquier	Lauriane Duraffourg	Amandine Vidon

=== Junior ===
Year	Gold	Silver	Bronze
2012	Julie Boucher	Anaïs Grimault	Audrey Menut
2013	Laura Perry	Émeline Gaultier	Audrey Menut
2014	Émeline Gaultier	Laura Perry	Chloé Fortin
2015	Juliette Labous	Hélène Clauzel	Maëlle Grossetête
2016	Hélène Clauzel	Juliette Labous	Maëlle Grossetête
2017	Jade Wiel	Maina Galand	Évita Muzic
2018	Jade Wiel (2)	Pasquine Vandermouten	Léa Curinier
2019	Amandine Fouquenet	Léa Curinier	Lauriane Duraffourg
2020	Line Burquier	Olivia Onesti	Lauriane Duraffourg
2021	Line Burquier	Olivia Onesti	Lilou Fabrègue
2022	Manon Briand	Alexandra Valade	Julie Bego
2023	Lise Klaes	Julie Bego	Alexandra Valade
