= Grand Prix Nommay =

Race details
- Region: Nommay, France
- Discipline: Cyclo-cross
- Competition: UCI Cyclo-cross World Cup
- Web site: www.cyclo-cross-nommay.fr/worldcup/index.php/en/

History
- First edition: 1978
- Editions: 40 (as of 2020)
- First winner: Serge Mannheim (FRA)
- Most wins: Francis Mourey (FRA) (5 wins)
- Most recent: Eli Iserbyt (BEL)

History (women)
- Most wins: Laurence Leboucher (FRA); Hanka Kupfernagel (GER); Lucie Chainel-Lefèvre (FRA); Katie Compton (USA); (3 wins)
- Most recent: Annemarie Worst (NED)

The Grand Prix Nommay is a cyclo-cross race held in Nommay, France, which is part of the UCI Cyclo-cross World Cup competition.

== Past winners ==
=== Men ===
Year	Winner	Second	Third
1978–79	Serge Mannheim (FRA)	Zanchetta	Roccès
1979–80	Zanchetta	Ballet	Guyou
1980–81	Zanchetta	Converset	Guyou
1981–82	Perret	Pierre-Yves Duzellier (FRA)	Gay
1982–83	Zanchetta; Rawyler	Mercier; Rochat	Frédéric Vichot (FRA); Vurpillot
1983–84	Guyou	Nachin	Mercier
1984–85	Nachin	Décrion	Frédéric Pofilet (FRA)
1985–86	Nachin	Serge Mannheim (FRA)	René Schlinger (FRA)
1986–87	Décrion	Nachin	Jean-Paul Hosotte (FRA)
1987–88	Kuiper; Wynants	De Vlaeminck; De Vlaeminck	Glaus; Thary
1988–89	Miloš Fišera (TCH)	Nachin	Sylvain Oswarek (POL)
1989–90	De Vlaeminck	Wynants	Nachin
1990–91	Mengin	De Vlaeminck	Kwasnicka
1991–92	Wynants	Richard Groenendaal (NED)	De Vlaeminck
1992–93	Cyrille Bonnand (FRA)	Lucas	Dominique Arnould (FRA)
1993–94	David Pagnier (FRA)	Gill	Bruno Lebras (FRA)
1994–95	Emmanuel Magnien (FRA)	Dominique Arnould (FRA)	David Pagnier (FRA)
1995–96	Mike Kluge (GER)	Dominique Arnould (FRA)	David Pagnier (FRA)
1996–97	Richard Groenendaal (NED)	Daniele Pontoni (ITA)	Mario De Clercq (BEL)
1997–98	Christophe Mengin (FRA)	Dominique Arnould (FRA)	Emmanuel Magnien (FRA)
1998–99	Adri van der Poel (NED)	Daniele Pontoni (ITA)	Mario De Clercq (BEL)
1999–2000	Daniele Pontoni (ITA)	Richard Groenendaal (NED)	Mario De Clercq (BEL)
2000–01	Régis Duros (FRA)	Guillaume Benoist (FRA)	Ondřej Lukeš (CZE)
2001–02	Erwin Vervecken (BEL)	Mario De Clercq (BEL)	Richard Groenendaal (NED)
2002–03	Dominique Arnould (FRA)	John Gadret (FRA)	Arnaud Labbe (FRA)
2003–04	Bart Wellens (BEL)	Richard Groenendaal (NED)	Erwin Vervecken (BEL)
2004–05	Sven Nys (BEL)	Tom Vannoppen (BEL)	Sven Vanthourenhout (BEL)
2005–06	Francis Mourey (FRA)	Christian Heule (SUI)	Arnaud Labbe (FRA)
2006–07	Sven Nys (BEL)	Bart Wellens (BEL)	Gerben de Knegt (NED)
2007–08	Francis Mourey (FRA)	Radomír Šimůnek Jr. (CZE)	John Gadret (FRA)
2008–09	Lars Boom (NED)	Sven Nys (BEL)	Bart Wellens (BEL)
2009–10	Niels Albert (BEL)	Zdeněk Štybar (CZE)	Sven Nys (BEL)
2010–11	Nicolas Bazin (FRA)	Christian Heule (SUI)	Jan Denuwelaere (BEL)
2011–12	Francis Mourey (FRA)	Steve Chainel (FRA)	Enrico Franzoi (ITA)
2012–13	Francis Mourey (FRA)	Arnold Jeannesson (FRA)	John Gadret (FRA)
2013–14	Tom Meeusen (BEL)	Francis Mourey (FRA)	Philipp Walsleben (GER)
2014–15	Francis Mourey (FRA)	Diether Sweeck (BEL)	Julien Taramarcaz (SUI)
2016–17	Clément Venturini (FRA)	Melvin Rulliere (FRA)	Arnold Jeannesson (FRA)
2017–18	Mathieu van der Poel (NED)	Wout van Aert (BEL)	Toon Aerts (BEL)
2019–20	Eli Iserbyt (BEL)	Toon Aerts (BEL)	Laurens Sweeck (BEL)

=== Women ===
Year	Winner	Second	Third
1999–2000	Annabella Stropparo (ITA)	Jennifer Dial (USA)	Ann Grande-Knapp (USA)
2000–01	Laurence Leboucher (FRA)	Virginie Souchon (FRA)	Marie Coulon (FRA)
2001–02	Lyne Bessette (CAN)	Corine Dorland (NED)	Reza Hormes-Ravenstijn (NED)
2002–03	Laurence Leboucher (FRA)	Maryline Salvetat (FRA)	Nadia Triquet (FRA)
2003–04	Hanka Kupfernagel (GER)	Maryline Salvetat (FRA)	Daphny van den Brand (NED)
2004–05	Hanka Kupfernagel (GER)	Daphny van den Brand (NED)	Maryline Salvetat (FRA)
2005–06	Maryline Salvetat (FRA)	Laurence Leboucher (FRA)	Corinne Sempé (FRA)
2006–07	Laurence Leboucher (FRA)	Maryline Salvetat (FRA)	Hanka Kupfernagel (GER)
2007–08	Pavla Havlíková (CZE)	Laurence Leboucher (FRA)	Sanne Cant (BEL)
2008–09	Katie Compton (USA)	Hanka Kupfernagel (GER)	Georgia Gould (USA)
2009–10	Katie Compton (USA)	Marianne Vos (NED)	Sanne van Paassen (NED)
2010–11	Hanka Kupfernagel (GER)	Jasmin Achermann (SUI)	Caroline Mani (FRA)
2011–12	Lucie Chainel-Lefèvre (FRA)	Hanka Kupfernagel (GER)	Gabby Day (GBR)
2012–13	Lucie Chainel-Lefèvre (FRA)	Pauline Ferrand-Prévot (FRA)	Christel Ferrier-Bruneau (FRA)
2013–14	Marianne Vos (NED)	Helen Wyman (GBR)	Eva Lechner (ITA)
2014–15	Lucie Chainel-Lefèvre (FRA)	Caroline Mani (FRA)	Lisa Heckmann (GER)
2016–17	Hélène Clauzel (FRA)	Perrine Clauzel (FRA)	Evita Muzic (FRA)
2017–18	Katie Compton (USA)	Kaitlin Keough (USA)	Pauline Ferrand-Prévot (FRA)
2019-20	Annemarie Worst (NED)	Ceylin del Carmen Alvarado (NED)	Katie Compton (USA)
