= UCI Cyclo-cross World Championships – Women's elite race =

Women's cyclo-cross world championships

- Rainbow jersey

Race details
- Date: End of January, beginning of February
- Discipline: Cyclo-cross
- Type: One-day
- Organiser: UCI

History
- First edition: 2000
- Editions: 27 (as of 2026)
- First winner: Hanka Kupfernagel (GER)
- Most wins: Marianne Vos (NED) (8 wins)
- Most recent: Lucinda Brand (NED)

The UCI Cyclo-cross World Championships (for Women), to use the official name, is the recognized world championship for cyclo-cross and has been organized annually since 2000 by the Union Cycliste Internationale, the sport's international governing body.

== Medalists ==
Year	Gold	Silver	Bronze
2000	Hanka Kupfernagel (GER)	Louise Robinson (GBR)	Daphny van den Brand (NED)
2001	Hanka Kupfernagel (GER)	Corine Dorland (NED)	Daphny van den Brand (NED)
2002	Laurence Leboucher (FRA)	Hanka Kupfernagel (GER)	Daphny van den Brand (NED)
2003	Daphny van den Brand (NED)	Hanka Kupfernagel (GER)	Laurence Leboucher (FRA)
2004	Laurence Leboucher (FRA)	Maryline Salvetat (FRA)	Hanka Kupfernagel (GER)
2005	Hanka Kupfernagel (GER)	Sabine Spitz (GER)	Mirjam Melchers (NED)
2006	Marianne Vos (NED)	Hanka Kupfernagel (GER)	Daphny van den Brand (NED)
2007	Maryline Salvetat (FRA)	Katie Compton (USA)	Laurence Leboucher (FRA)
2008	Hanka Kupfernagel (GER)	Marianne Vos (NED)	Laurence Leboucher (FRA)
2009	Marianne Vos (NED)	Hanka Kupfernagel (GER)	Katie Compton (USA)
2010	Marianne Vos (NED)	Hanka Kupfernagel (GER)	Daphny van den Brand (NED)
2011	Marianne Vos (NED)	Katie Compton (USA)	Kateřina Nash (CZE)
2012	Marianne Vos (NED)	Daphny van den Brand (NED)	Sanne Cant (BEL)
2013	Marianne Vos (NED)	Katie Compton (USA)	Lucie Chainel-Lefèvre (FRA)
2014	Marianne Vos (NED)	Eva Lechner (ITA)	Helen Wyman (GBR)
2015	Pauline Ferrand-Prévot (FRA)	Sanne Cant (BEL)	Marianne Vos (NED)
2016	Thalita de Jong (NED)	Caroline Mani (FRA)	Sanne Cant (BEL)
2017	Sanne Cant (BEL)	Marianne Vos (NED)	Kateřina Nash (CZE)
2018	Sanne Cant (BEL)	Katie Compton (USA)	Lucinda Brand (NED)
2019	Sanne Cant (BEL)	Lucinda Brand (NED)	Marianne Vos (NED)
2020	Ceylin del Carmen Alvarado (NED)	Annemarie Worst (NED)	Lucinda Brand (NED)
2021	Lucinda Brand (NED)	Annemarie Worst (NED)	Denise Betsema (NED)
2022	Marianne Vos (NED)	Lucinda Brand (NED)	Silvia Persico (ITA)
2023	Fem van Empel (NED)	Puck Pieterse (NED)	Lucinda Brand (NED)
2024	Fem van Empel (NED)	Lucinda Brand (NED)	Puck Pieterse (NED)
2025	Fem van Empel (NED)	Lucinda Brand (NED)	Puck Pieterse (NED)
2026	Lucinda Brand (NED)	Ceylin del Carmen Alvarado (NED)	Puck Pieterse (NED)

== Medal counts ==
=== By country ===
Rank	Nation	Gold	Silver	Bronze	Total
1	Netherlands (NED)	16	12	15	43
2	Germany (GER)	4	6	1	11
3	France (FRA)	4	2	4	10
4	Belgium (BEL)	3	1	2	6
5	United States (USA)	0	4	1	5
6	Great Britain (GBR)	0	1	1	2
6	Italy (ITA)	0	1	1	2
8	Czech Republic (CZE)	0	0	2	2
Totals (8 entries)		27	27	27	81

=== By rider ===
Rank	Rider	Gold	Silver	Bronze	Total
1	Marianne Vos (NED)	8	2	2	12
2	Hanka Kupfernagel (GER)	4	5	1	10
3	Sanne Cant (BEL)	3	1	2	6
4	Fem van Empel (NED)	3	0	0	3
5	Lucinda Brand (NED)	2	4	3	9
6	Laurence Leboucher (FRA)	2	0	3	5
7	Daphny van den Brand (NED)	1	1	5	7
8	Maryline Salvetat (FRA)	1	1	0	2
9	Ceylin del Carmen Alvarado (NED)	1	0	0	1
9	Pauline Ferrand-Prévot (FRA)	1	0	0	1
9	Thalita de Jong (NED)	1	0	0	1
