= Yan Gras =

French cyclist

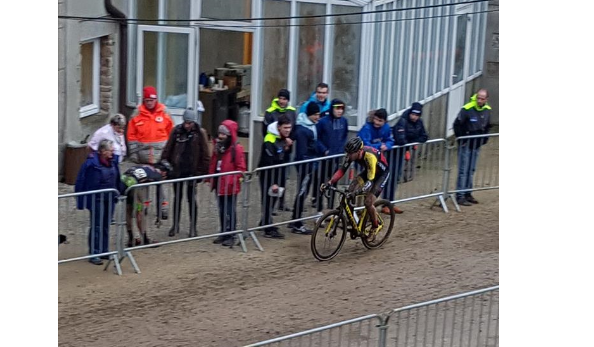

Personal information
- Born: 7 January 1996 (age 30)

Cycling career
- Sport: Cycling
- Current team: Team Podiocom CC; SCO Dijon
- Disciplines: Cyclo-cross; Road
- Role: Rider

Amateur teams
- 2015–2016: E.C.Stephanois
- 2017–2018: Team Macadams Cowboys
- 2019–: SCO Dijon

Professional teams
- 2016–2020: Cross Team by G4
- 2020–2021: AAA Sörius
- 2021–: Team Podiocom CC
Medal record
Men's cyclo-cross
Representing France
World Championships
| Bronze medal – third place | 2018 Valkenburg | Under-23 Race |

Yan Gras (born 7 January 1996) is a French cyclist, who competes in cyclo-cross for UCI Cyclo-cross Pro Team Podiocom CC and for French amateur team SCO Dijon on the road.

== Major results ==
2012–2013
3rd National Junior Championships
2013–2014
1st Leudelange Juniors
Challenge la France Juniors

1st Flamanville
3rd Saint-Etienne-lès-Remiremont

3rd UEC European Junior Championships
2014–2015
1st Nommay Under-23
2015–2016
3rd Overall Under-23 Coupe de France
2017–2018
UCI Under-23 World Cup

2nd Nommay

3rd UCI Under-23 World Championships
3rd Overall Under-23 Coupe de France

1st Jablines
1st Flamanville

2021–2022
2nd National Championships
2nd La Grandville
2nd Dijon
