= 2011 Tro-Bro Léon =

Race details
- Dates: 17 April 2011
- Stages: 1
- Distance: 206.4 km (128.3 mi)
- Winning time: 4h 58' 07"

Results
	Winner	Vincent Jérôme (FRA)
	Second	Will Routley (CAN)
	Third	Arnold Jeannesson (FRA)

The 2011 Tro-Bro Léon was the 28th edition of the Tro-Bro Léon cycle race and was held on 17 April 2011. The race was won by Vincent Jérôme.

== General classification ==
Final general classification

Rank	Rider	Time
1	Vincent Jérôme (FRA)	4h 58' 07"
2	Will Routley (CAN)	+ 1"
3	Arnold Jeannesson (FRA)	+ 20"
4	Steve Chainel (FRA)	+ 20"
5	Benoît Daeninck (FRA)	+ 30"
6	Bruno Langlois (CAN)	+ 32"
7	Mathieu Ladagnous (FRA)	+ 36"
8	Mathieu Drujon (FRA)	+ 36"
9	Alexandre Blain (FRA)	+ 36"
10	Kristof Goddaert (BEL)	+ 36"
