= 2004 UCI Cyclo-cross World Championships =

Cyclo-cross championship

- Venue: Pontchâteau, France
- Date: January 31–February 1, 2004
- Coordinates: 47°25′48″N 2°04′59″W
- Events: 4

The 2004 UCI Cyclo-cross World Championships were held in Pont-Château, France on Saturday January 31 and Sunday February 1, 2004.

== Medal summary ==
Event	Gold		Silver		Bronze	
Men's events
Men's elite race	Bart Wellens (BEL)	1h 02' 19"	Mario De Clercq (BEL)	s.t.	Sven Vanthourenhout (BEL)	+ 7"
Men's under-23 race	Kevin Pauwels (BEL)	49' 38"	Mariusz Gil (POL)	+ 8"	Martin Zlámalík (CZE)	+ 16"
Men's junior race	Niels Albert (BEL)	40' 33"	Roman Kreuziger (CZE)	+ 22"	Clément Lhotellerie (FRA)	+ 1' 29"
Women's events
Women's elite race	Laurence Leboucher (FRA)	43' 06"	Maryline Salvetat (FRA)	+ 37"	Hanka Kupfernagel (GER)	+ 51"

== Medal table ==
Rank	Nation	Gold	Silver	Bronze	Total
1	Belgium (BEL)	3	1	1	5
2	France (FRA)	1	1	1	3
3	Czech Republic (CZE)	0	1	1	2
4	Poland (POL)	0	1	0	1
5	Germany (GER)	0	0	1	1
Totals (5 entries)		4	4	4	12

== Men's Elite ==
- Held on Sunday February 1, 2004

RANK	2004 UCI CYCLO-CROSS WORLD CHAMPIONSHIPS	TIME
	Bart Wellens (BEL)	01:02:19
	Mario De Clercq (BEL)	—
	Sven Vanthourenhout (BEL)	+ 0.07
4.	Daniele Pontoni (ITA)	+ 0.21
5.	Ben Berden (BEL)	+ 0.24
6.	Erwin Vervecken (BEL)	+ 0.29
7.	Francis Mourey (FRA)	+ 0.38
8.	Petr Dlask (CZE)	+ 0.40
9.	Michael Baumgärtner (SUI)	+ 0.49
10.	Alessandro Fontana (ITA)	+ 1.09

== Men's Juniors ==
- Held on Saturday January 31, 2004

RANK	2004 UCI CYCLO-CROSS WORLD CHAMPIONSHIPS	TIME
	Niels Albert (BEL)	00:40:33
	Roman Kreuziger (CZE)	+ 0.22
	Clément Lhotellerie (FRA)	+ 1.29
4.	Clément Cid (FRA)	+ 1.47
5.	Petr Novotný (CZE)	+ 1.49
6.	Jan Škarnitzl (CZE)	+ 2.05
7.	René Lang (SUI)	+ 2.10
8.	Thijs van Amerongen (NED)	+ 2.44
9.	Damien Robert (FRA)	+ 2.46
10.	Jonathan Lopez (FRA)	—

== Men's Espoirs ==
- Held on Saturday January 31, 2004

RANK	2004 UCI CYCLO-CROSS WORLD CHAMPIONSHIPS	TIME
	Kevin Pauwels (BEL)	00:49:38
	Mariusz Gil (POL)	+ 0.08
	Martin Zlámalík (CZE)	+ 0.16
4.	Sébastien Minard (FRA)	—
5.	Lukas Flückiger (SUI)	+ 0.18
6.	Zdeněk Štybar (CZE)	+ 0.25
7.	Krzysztof Kuzniak (POL)	—
8.	Enrico Franzoi (ITA)	—
9.	Klaas Vantornout (BEL)	+ 0.29
10.	Wesley Van Der Linden (BEL)	—

== Women's Elite ==
- Held on Sunday February 1, 2004

RANK	2004 UCI CYCLO-CROSS WORLD CHAMPIONSHIPS	TIME
	Laurence Leboucher (FRA)	00:43:06
	Maryline Salvetat (FRA)	+ 0:37
	Hanka Kupfernagel (GER)	+ 0:51
4.	Ann Knapp (USA)	+ 1:48
5.	Alison Dunlap (USA)	+ 1:54
6.	Louise Robinson (GBR)	+ 2:02
7.	Marianne Vos (NED)	+ 2:40
8.	Corinne Sempe (FRA)	+ 2:43
9.	Reza Hormes-Ravenstijn (NED)	+ 2:44
10.	Birgit Hollmann (GER)	+ 2:46
