= Jérôme Chiotti =

French cyclist

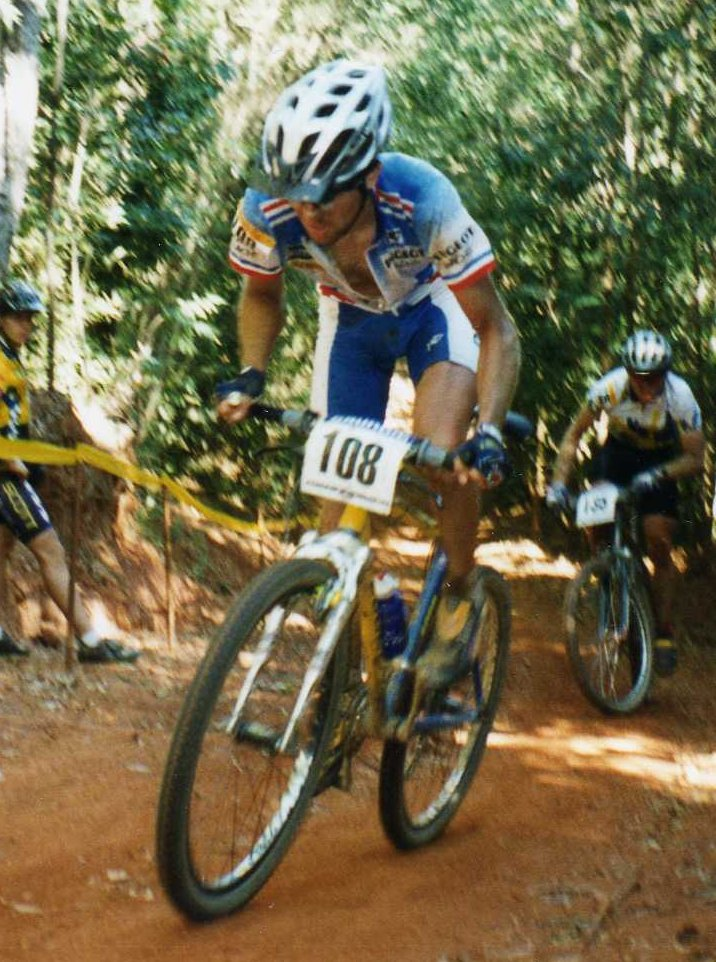
- Chiotti in 1996

Personal information
- Full name: Jerome Chiotti
- Born: 18 January 1972 (age 54) Millau, France

Cycling career
- Sport: Cycling
- Current team: Retired
- Disciplines: Mountain biking; Road; Cyclo-cross
- Role: Rider

Amateur teams
- 1998: CSM Persan
- 1999–2000: VS Chartres
- 2001: SCO Dijon
- 2002: AC Lanester
- 2003: UC Saint-Chély d'Apcher

Professional teams
- ?: Giant/GT (MTB)
- 1994: Catavana–AS Corbeil–Essonnes–Cedico
- 1995: Le Groupement
- 1996–1997: Festina–Lotus
Medal record
Representing France
Men's mountain bike racing
World Championships
Silver medal – second place	1998 Mont Sainte-Anne	Cross-country

Jérôme Chiotti (born 18 January 1972) is a French former professional racing cyclist who competed in road, cyclo-cross and mountain bike disciplines. He is most renowned for his victory in the 1996 World Mountain Bike Championships, a title which he later renounced by admitting doping.

== Doping admission ==
Chiotti admitted to doping in order to win the 1996 World Championships in an interview with French magazine Vélo Vert on 23 April 2000. He admitted to spending up to US$6000 per year for EPO. He consequently renounced his World title during a press conference in Paris on 25 May 2000 and was subsequently banned for six months. The official UCI results were amended to reflect Thomas Frischknecht as the winner of the 1996 World Champion title.

== Major results ==
=== Mountain bike ===
~~1996~~
~~1st Cross-country, UCI World Championships~~
1998
2nd Cross-country, UCI World Championships
1999
1st Cross-country, National Championships
2001
1st Cross-country, National Championships
2002
1st Transmaurienne Vanoise
2003
1st Transmaurienne Vanoise

=== Cyclo-cross ===
1988–1989
3rd National Junior Championships
1989–1990
1st National Junior Championships
2nd UCI Junior World Championships
1991–1992
1st National Under-23 Championships
1993–1994
1st Cyclo-cross du Mingant
1994–1995
1st National Championships
1st Cyclo-cross du Mingant
UCI World Cup

2nd Igorre

1995–1996
2nd National Championships
UCI World Cup

3rd Pontchâteau
3rd Heerlen

1999–2000
Challenge de la France

1st Pléneuf-Val-André

2000–2001
Challenge de la France

2nd Liévin

=== Road ===
1998
2nd Overall Tour de Bretagne
