= Fabien Doubey =

French cyclist

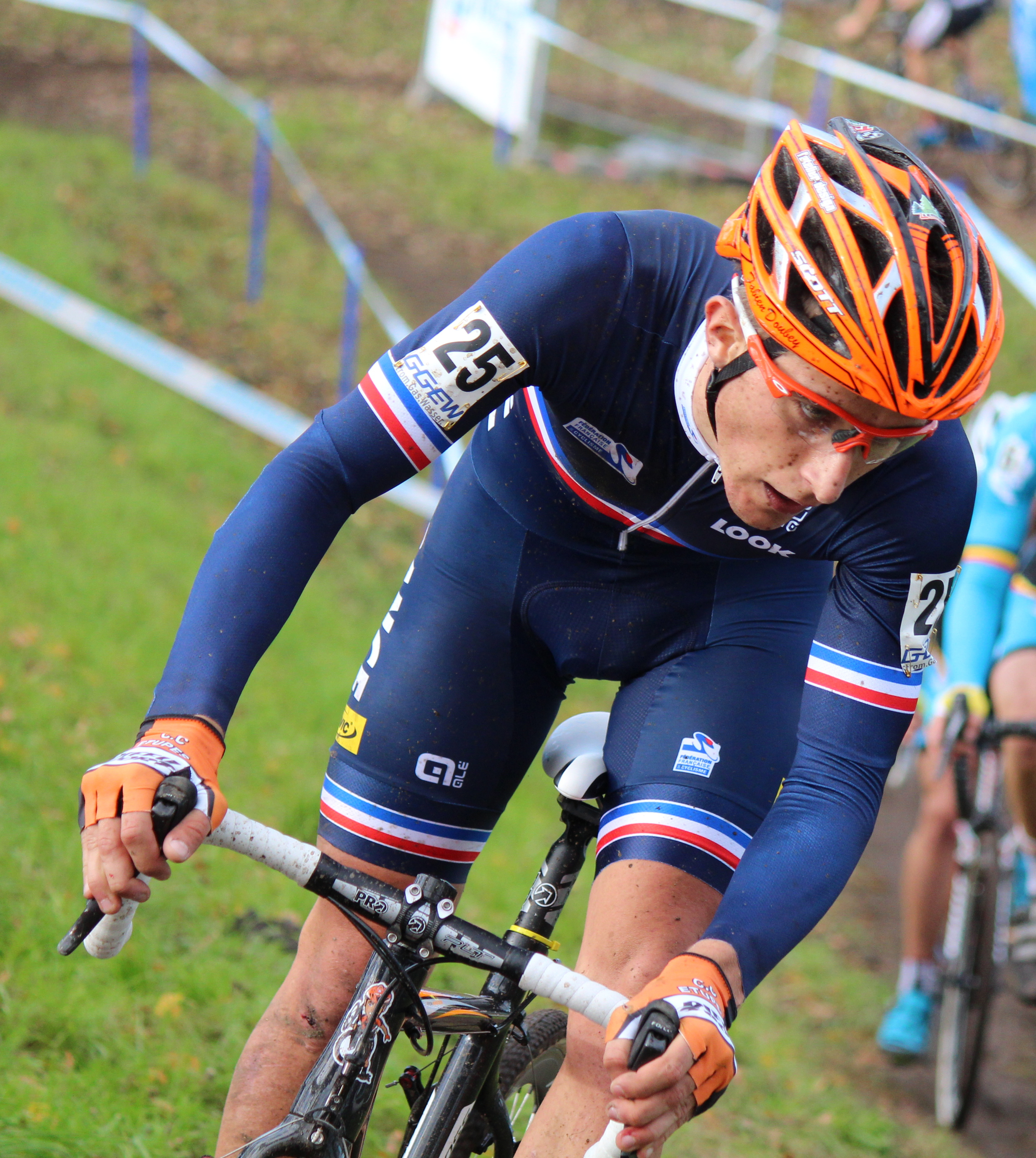
- Doubey in 2014.

Personal information
- Full name: Fabien Doubey
- Born: 21 October 1993 (age 32) Viriat, France
- Height: 1.74 m (5 ft 9 in)
- Weight: 62 kg (137 lb)

Cycling career
- Sport: Cycling
- Current team: Team TotalEnergies
- Disciplines: Cyclo-cross; Road
- Role: Rider

Amateur teams
- 2012–2013: SC Arinthod Foyer Rural
- 2013–2016: CC Étupes
- 2015: FDJ (stagiaire)
- 2016: FDJ (stagiaire)

Professional teams
- 2017–2020: Wanty–Groupe Gobert
- 2021–: Total Direct Énergie

Fabien Doubey (born 21 October 1993) is a French cyclist, who currently rides for UCI ProTeam Team TotalEnergies. His brother, Loïc Doubey is also a cyclist.

== Major results ==
=== Cyclo-cross ===
2010–2011
1st National Junior Championships
1st Nommay Juniors
2nd UCI World Junior Championships
UCI Junior World Cup

3rd Hoogerheide

2012–2023
2nd Pontchâteau Under-23
2013–2014
2nd Saint-Etienne-lès-Remiremont Under-23
3rd National Under-23 Championships
2014–2015
1st National Under-23 Championships
Under-23 Coupe de France

1st Besançon
1st Sisteron

2nd Lutterbach
2nd Rheinfelden
5th Overall UCI Under-23 World Cup

3rd Hoogerheide
3rd Valkenburg

2019–2020
3rd National Championships
2021–2022
3rd National Championships
3rd Pétange
2022–2023
2nd National Championships
3rd La Grandville
3rd Xàtiva

=== Road ===
2014
1st Franche-Comté Road Race Championships
2015
1st Stage 4 Tour Nivernais Morvan
2016
1st Stage 4 Tour du Jura
2019
4th Trofeo Matteotti
6th Tokyo 2020 Test Event
8th Overall Tour of Oman
2024
5th Overall Tour du Rwanda
2025 (1 pro win)
1st Overall Tour du Rwanda
10th Overall Étoile de Bessèges

=== Grand Tour general classification results timeline ===
Grand Tour	2021	2022	2023
Giro d'Italia	—	—	—
Tour de France	78	—	—
Vuelta a España	—	—	36

Legend
—	Did not compete
DNF	Did not finish
