= 1994 UCI Cyclo-cross World Championships =

Cyclo-cross championship

- Venue: Koksijde, Belgium
- Date: 30 January 1994
- Coordinates: 51°06′N 02°39′E
- Cyclists participating: 59 (Elite); 73 (Juniors)
- Events: 2

The 1994 UCI Cyclo-cross World Championships were held in Koksijde, Belgium. As the Amateur's race disappeared from the program, it was organized on one day, Sunday 30 January 1994. It was the 45th edition of the UCI Cyclo-cross World Championships.

== Medal summary ==
Event	Gold		Silver		Bronze	
Men's elite race	Paul Herijgers (BEL)	1:00:38	Richard Groenendaal (NED)	+ 0:08	Erwin Vervecken (BEL)	+ 0:39
Men's junior race	Gretienus Gommers (NED)	39' 48"	Kamil Ausbuher (CZE)	+ 0:24	Ben Berden (BEL)	+ 1:00

== Results ==
=== Men's Elite ===
RANK	NAME	TIME
Gold medal	Paul Herijgers (BEL)	1:00:38
Silver medal	Richard Groenendaal (NED)	+ 0:08
Bronze medal	Erwin Vervecken (BEL)	+ 0:39
4.	Daniele Pontoni (ITA)	+ 0:50
5.	Adrie van der Poel (NED)	+ 1:12
6.	Cyrille Bonnand (FRA)	+ 1:25
7.	Thomas Frischknecht (SUI)	+ 1:32
8.	Marc Janssens (BEL)	+ 1:36
9.	Radomír Šimůnek (CZE)	+ 1:37
10.	Danny De Bie (BEL)	+ 1:41

=== Men's Juniors ===
RANK	NAME	TIME
Gold medal	Gretienus Gommers (NED)	39:48
Silver medal	Kamil Ausbuher (CZE)	+ 0:24
Bronze medal	Ben Berden (BEL)	+ 1:00
4.	Sven Nys (BEL)	+ 1:24
5.	David Süssemilch (CZE)	+ 1:27
6.	David Willemsens (BEL)	+ 1:40
7.	Martin Elsnic (CZE)	+ 1:57
8.	Miguel Martinez (FRA)	+ 2:15
9.	Urs Steinmann (GER)	+ 2:16
10.	Beat Blum (SUI)	+ 2:17
