= Steve Chainel =

French cyclist

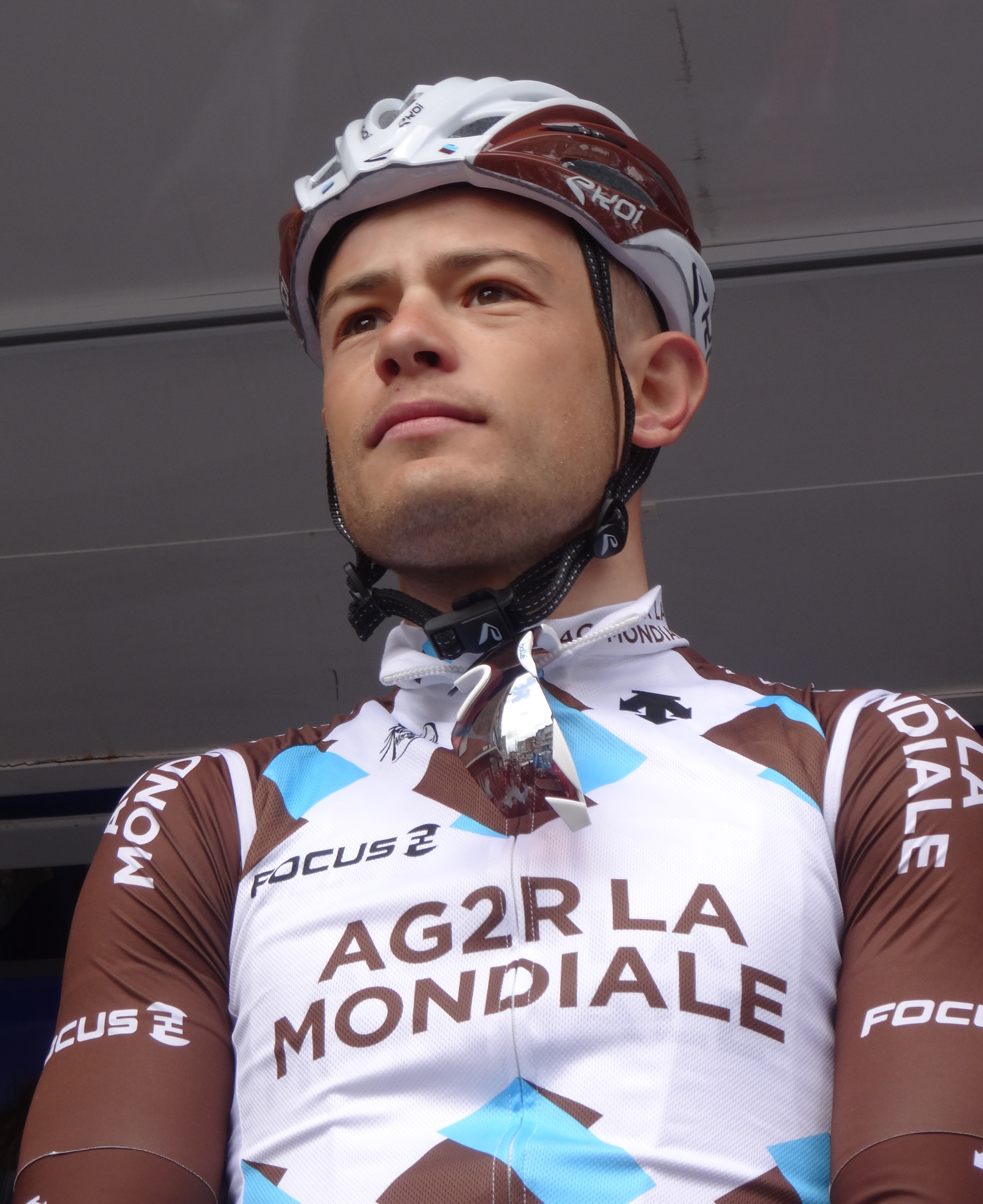
- Chainel at the 2014 Four Days of Dunkirk

Personal information
- Full name: Steve Chainel
- Born: 6 September 1983 (age 43) Remiremont, France
- Height: 180 cm (5 ft 11 in)
- Weight: 69 kg (152 lb; 10.9 st)

Cycling career
- Sport: Cycling
- Current team: Retired
- Disciplines: Cyclo-cross; Road
- Role: Rider
- Rider type: Classics rider

Amateur team
- 2006: CC Étupes
- 2018–2019: AVC Aix-en-Provence

Professional teams
- 2007–2008: Auber 93
- 2009–2010: Bbox Bouygues Telecom
- 2011–2012: FDJ
- 2013–2014: Ag2r–La Mondiale
- 2015: Cofidis
- 2015–2023: Cross Team by G4

Steve Chainel (born 6 September 1983 in Remiremont) is a French former professional racing cyclist. Chainel competed for the Auber 93, Bbox Bouygues Telecom, FDJ, Ag2r–La Mondiale, Cofidis and Cross Team Legendre professional teams.

Chainel left FDJ–BigMat at the end of the 2012 season, and signed a two-year contract with Ag2r–La Mondiale for the 2013 and 2014 seasons. Subsequently, Cofidis announced that they had signed Chainel for 2015.

== Major results ==
=== Cyclo-cross ===
1999–2000
1st National Junior Championships
2003–2004
3rd UEC European Under-23 Championships
2004–2005
2nd National Under-23 Championships
2005–2006
1st Int. Radquerfeldein
2nd Frankfurter Rad-Cross
2nd Challenge de la France Cycliste 1
2nd Challenge de la France Cycliste 2
4th UCI World Championships
2006–2007
1st Marle
1st Int. Radquerfeldein
2nd Frankfurter Rad-Cross
3rd Challenge de la France Cycliste 2
3rd Intern. Radquer Hittnau
2007–2008
1st Grand Prix Hotel Threeland
2nd Cyclo-cross International de Marle
2nd Challenge de la France Cycliste 1
2008–2009
1st Grand Prix Hotel Threeland
1st Grand Prix de la Commune de Niederanven
2nd National Championships
2nd Challenge de la France Cycliste de Cyclo-cross 1
2nd Challenge de la France Cycliste de Cyclo-cross 2
9th UCI World Championships
2009–2010
1st Grand Prix Wetzikon
1st Grand Prix Hotel Threeland
2nd National Championships
2nd Challenge de la France 2
3rd Challenge de la France 1
3rd Cyclo-cross International de Marle
2010–2011
Challenge la France

1st Saverne
3rd Saint-Jean-De-Monts
3rd Miramas

1st GP de la Commune de Contern
2nd Grand Prix Hotel Threeland
3rd Velka Cena Mesta Tabora
2011–2012
2nd National Championships
2nd Nommay
2nd Cyclo-cross International de Marle
Challenge la France de cyclo-cross

2nd Besançon

2013–2014
2nd Challenge National 1ère Epreuve Saint-Etienne-lès-Remiremont
2014–2015
QianSen Trophy

3rd Yanqing Station

2015–2016
Coupe de France

2nd Flamanville

2nd GGEW Grand Prix
2nd GP-5-Sterne-Region
Qiansen Trophy

2nd Yanqing Station
3rd Qiongzhong Station

3rd Grand-Prix de la Commune de Contern
2016–2017
1st Trek CXC Cup
2nd Val d'Ille Intermarché Tour
EKZ CrossTour

2nd Aigle

4th Overall Coupe de France

3rd Erôme Gervans

2017–2018
1st National Championships
2nd Overall Coupe de France

1st Besançon
2nd Flamanville
3rd Jablines
3rd La Mézière

2nd Jingle Cross 2
10th UCI World Championships
2018–2019
1st Utsunomiya Day 1
2nd Utsunomiya Day 2
3rd Cyclo-cross International de la Solidarite
4th Overall Coupe de France de cyclo-cross

3rd Flamanville

4th Overall EKZ CrossTour
2019–2020
2nd Overall Coupe de France de cyclo-cross

1st Andrezieux-Boutheon
2nd La Meziere

2nd Jingle Cross 1
2nd Grand Prix Topolcianky
2nd Grand Prix Podbrezová
3rd Mingant Lanarvily
2020–2021
1st Stockholm
2022–2023
2nd Erstein
3rd Auxerre

=== Road ===
2005
10th Paris–Mantes-en-Yvelines
2006
1st Nancray
2007
5th Paris–Mantes-en-Yvelines
7th Trophée des Grimpeurs
2008
1st Overall Circuit de Lorraine

1st Stage 4

2nd Trophée des Grimpeurs
2nd Châteauroux Classic
2009
9th Overall Three Days of De Panne
2010
1st Stage 1 Three Days of De Panne
4th Dwars door Vlaanderen
2011
4th Tro-Bro Léon
5th Paris–Troyes
6th Grand Prix de la Ville de Lillers
2012
8th Gent–Wevelgem
2014
6th Le Samyn
2015
6th Le Samyn

==== Grand Tour general classification results timeline ====
Grand Tour	2009	2010	2011	2012	2013
Giro d'Italia	DNF	—	—	—	—
Tour de France	—	—	—	—	—
Vuelta a España	—	—	—	—	DNF

Legend
—	Did not compete
DNF	Did not finish
