= Clément Lhotellerie =

French cyclist

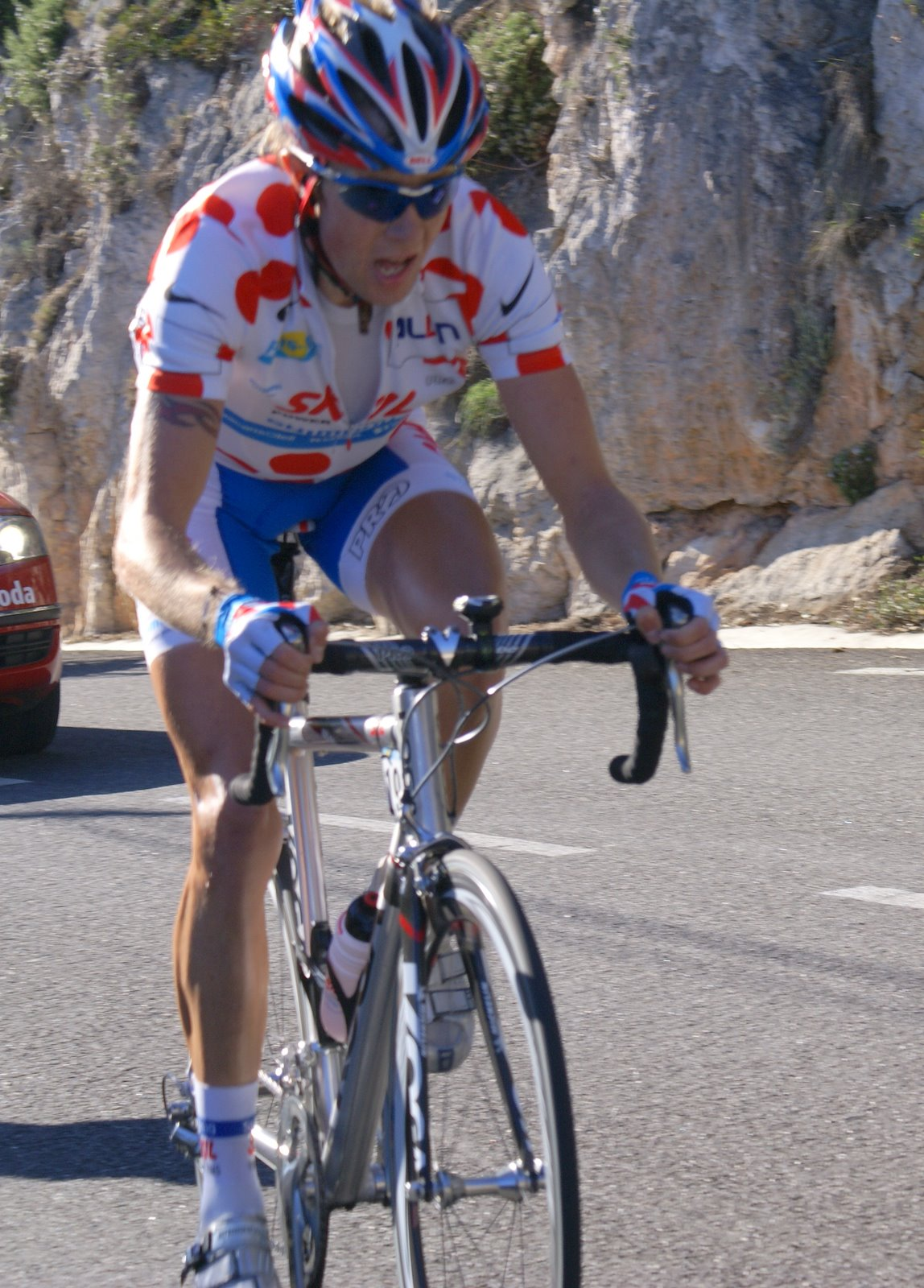
- Climbing in the Polka-dot jersey at 2008 Paris–Nice

Personal information
- Full name: Clément Lhotellerie
- Born: 19 March 1986 (age 40) Charleville-Mézières, France

Cycling career
- Sport: Cycling
- Current team: Retired
- Disciplines: Road; Cyclo-cross
- Role: Rider

Amateur teams
- 2006: Vélo-Club La Pomme Marseille
- 2006: Crédit Agricole (stagiaire)
- 2011: Royale Pédale Saint Martin
- 2014–2015: Team Peltrax–CS Dammarie-lès-Lys

Professional teams
- 2007–2008: Skil–Shimano
- 2009: Vacansoleil
- 2010: Roubaix–Lille Métropole
- 2012–2013: Colba–Superano Ham

Clément Lhotellerie (born 19 March 1986) is a French former professional road racing cyclist.

== Career ==
Born in Charleville-Mézières, Ardennes, Lhotellerie was an accomplished mountain-biker and cyclo-cross rider before switching to the road. He had won the French cyclo-cross championships in Juniors and U23 categories. He turned professional for Skil–Shimano cycling team in 2007. In early 2008 he finished second in the first stage and the overall classification of Vuelta a Andalucía. He later won the Mountains classification of Paris–Nice and also finished second in the third stage and eleventh in the overall classification.

Lhotellerie returned to the amateur ranks in 2014, with Team Peltrax-CS Dammarie-lès-Lys.

== Doping ==
On 2 July 2009 his team announced that he had tested positive for methylhexanamine, which Lhotellerie claimed was from contaminated geranium oil.

== Major results ==
2003
1st Junior race, National Cyclo-cross Championships
2004
1st Junior race, National Cyclo-cross Championships
3rd Junior race, UCI Cyclo-cross World Championships
3rd Junior race, UEC European Cyclo-cross Championships
2006
1st Under-23 race, National Cyclo-cross Championships
1st Overall Circuit de Saône-et-Loire
2007
1st Mountains classification 3-Länder-Tour
4th Overall Tour du Limousin
9th Overall Niedersachsen-Rundfahrt
2008
1st Mountains classification Paris–Nice
1st Stage 1b (TTT) Brixia Tour
2nd Overall Vuelta a Andalucía
2nd Overall Four Days of Dunkirk
2012
1st Flèche Ardennaise
2013
3rd Omloop Het Nieuwsblad U23
5th Overall Boucle de l'Artois
6th Circuit de Wallonie
10th Flèche Ardennaise
2015
1st National Cyclo-cross Championships
