= Georges Tribouillard =

French cyclist (1883–1919)

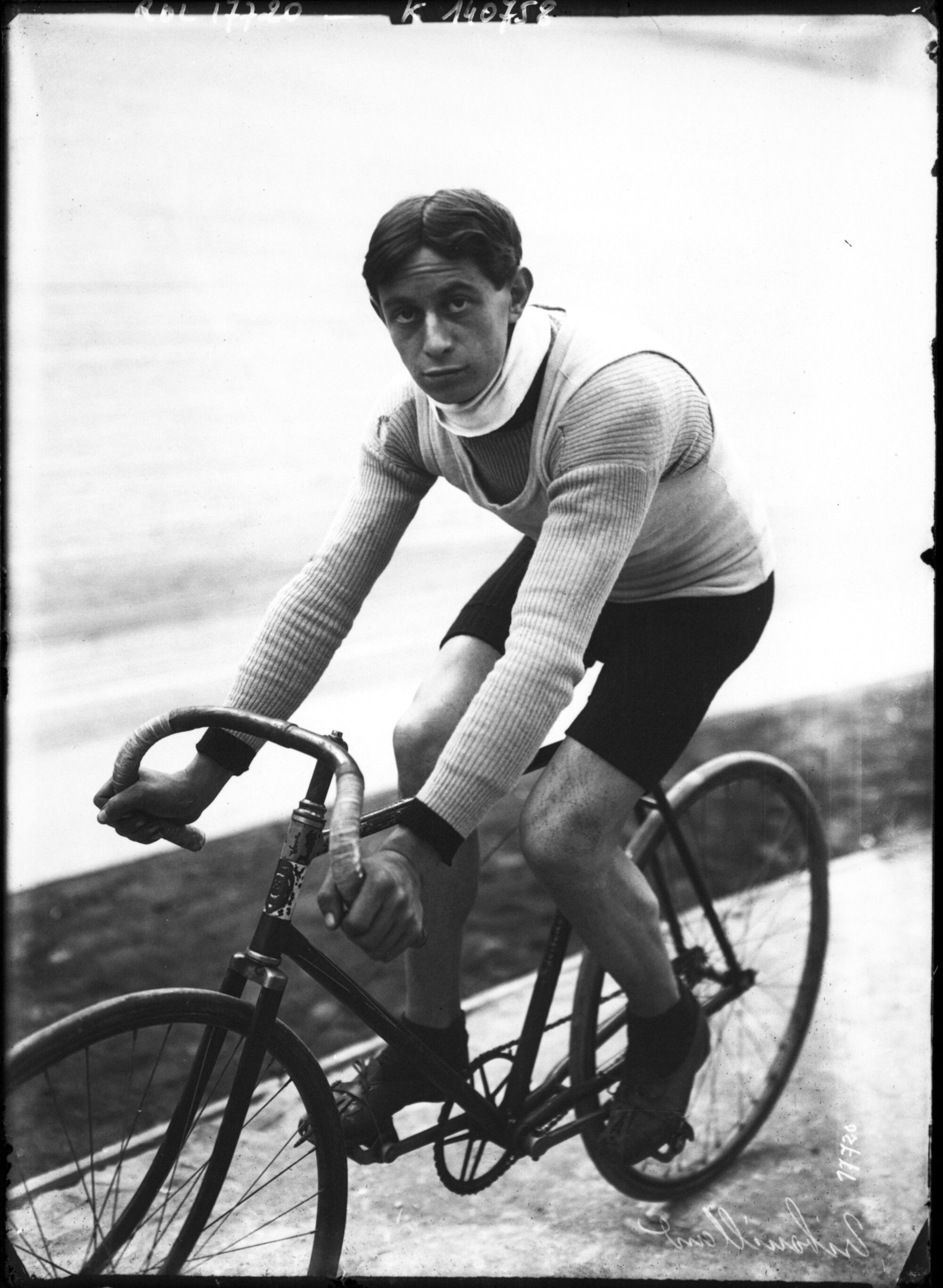
- Tribouillard in 1912

Personal information
- Born: Georges Tribouillard; 22 March 1883 Le Bignon-Mirabeau, Loiret, France
- Died: 16 March 1919 (aged 35) Paris 8th arrondissement, France
- Height: 164 cm (5 ft 5 in)

Cycling career
- Sport: Cycling
- Discipline: Road
- Role: Rider

Professional team
- 1908–1914: La Française

Georges Tribouillard (22 March 1883 – 16 March 1919) was a French professional road cyclist. He competed professionally from 1908 to 1914 and was known as a modest but respected rider.

== Biography ==
Tribouillard was born in Le Bignon-Mirabeau, in the Loiret department of France. He raced professionally for La Française for three years and was often sought after as a pacer in long-distance events such as Bordeaux–Paris and the French National Championship.

During World War I, he served as a soldier but suffered a serious aviation accident that cost him an eye. Classified as "réformé n°1" (unfit for further military service), he was later assigned to the Voisin aircraft works. He died on 16 March 1919 at his home in the 8th arrondissement of Paris, reportedly from severe stomach ailments related to his wartime injuries.

== Major results ==
1908
10th Paris–Tours
1909
2nd Paris-Honfleur
8th Paris–Dreux
9th Paris–Tours
1910
9th Paris–Tours
13th Paris–Roubaix
1911
2nd National Cyclo-cross Championships
2nd Paris–Beaugency
7th Paris–Roubaix
7th Giro di Lombardia
7th Overall Tour of Belgium

3rd Stage 3
4th Stage 6
6th Stage 7

15th Paris–Le Mans
1912
2nd Paris–Honfleur
1913
7th Paris–Tours
8th Milan–Modena
20th Paris–Menin

=== Grand Tour general classification results ===
Stage races	1914
Tour de France	DNF

=== Classic cycle races results ===
Classic cycle races	1908	1909	1910	1911	1912	1913	1914
Paris–Roubaix	—	—	13th	7th	35th	27th	39th
Milan–San Remo	—	—	—	—	32nd	DNF	—
Paris–Tours	10th	—	9th	—	—	7th	—
