= Léa Curinier =

French cyclist

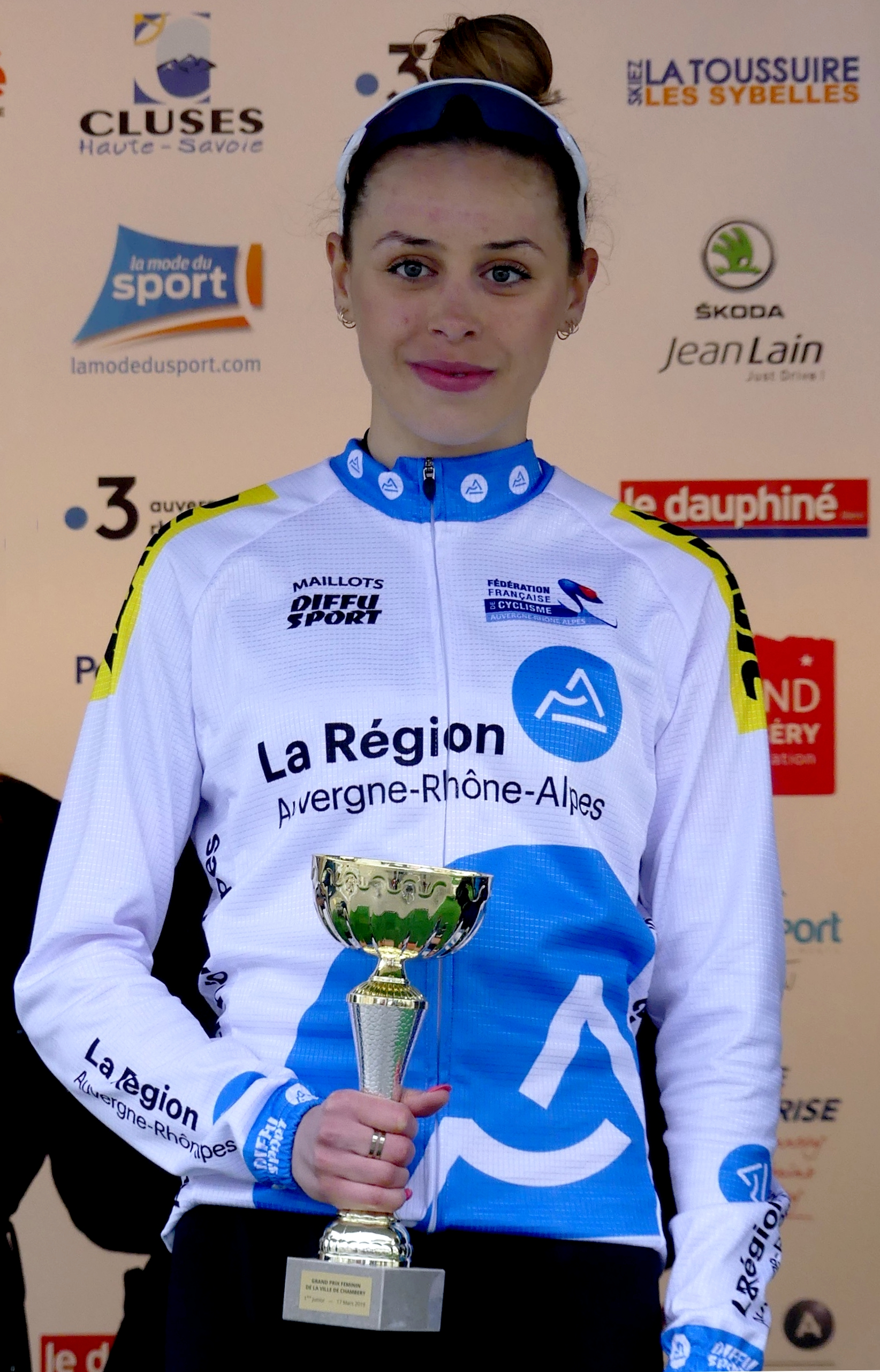

Personal information
- Born: 21 April 2001 (age 25) Valence, Drôme, France
- Height: 1.70 m (5 ft 7 in)
- Weight: 53 kg (117 lb)

Cycling career
- Sport: Cycling
- Current team: Arkéa–B&B Hotels
- Disciplines: Road; Cyclo-cross
- Role: Rider

Amateur teams
- 2017: UC Montmeyran Valence
- 2018–2019: DN Auvergne-Rhône-Alpes

Professional teams
- 2020–2021: Arkéa Pro Cycling Team
- 2022–2023: Team DSM
- 2024–: Arkéa–B&B Hotels

Léa Curinier (born 21 April 2001) is a French professional racing cyclist, who currently rides for UCI Women's WorldTeam FDJ United–Suez. In October 2020, she rode in the women's edition of the 2020 Liège–Bastogne–Liège race in Belgium.

== Major results ==
=== Road ===
2019
1st Time trial, National Junior Championships
8th Road race, UCI Junior World Championships
8th Overall Watersley Ladies Challenge
2023
2nd Dwars door de Westhoek
6th Overall Baloise Ladies Tour

1st Young rider classification

=== Cyclo-cross ===
2017–2018
3rd National Junior Championships
2018–2019
2nd National Junior Championships
2021–2022
1st La Grandville
