= Antonin Canavese =

French cyclist

Personal information
- Born: 4 April 1929
- Died: 25 June 2016 (aged 87)

Cycling career
- Sport: Cycling
- Role: Rider

Antonin Canavese (4 April 1929 – 25 June 2016) was a French racing cyclist. He rode in the 1950 Tour de France.
