= Bruno Lebras =

French cyclo-cross cyclist (born 1962)

Personal information
- Born: 30 October 1962 (age 63) Argenteuil, France

Cycling career
- Sport: Cycling
- Current team: Retired
- Disciplines: Cyclo-cross; Cross-country; Road
- Role: Rider

Amateur teams
- –: VC Montigny-lès-Cormeilles
- 1989–1990: CSM Persan

Professional teams
- 1990–1994: CSM Persan–Bic
- 1992: Perrier
- 1995: Sunn–Chippie
- 1997: Sunn–Nike
Medal record
Representing Czech Republic
Men's Cyclo-cross
World Championships
Bronze medal – third place	1990 Getxo	Elite race
Bronze medal – third place	1991 Gieten	Elite race

Bruno Lebras (born 30 October 1962) is a French former professional cyclist who specialized in cyclo-cross. He most notably won the bronze medal in the elite race at the 1990 and 1991 UCI Cyclo-cross World Championships. He also competed in cross-country mountain biking, winning races including the Roc d'Azur and the Transvésubienne.

== Major results ==
=== Cyclo-cross ===
1979–1980
3rd National Junior Championships
1981–1982
1st National Amateur Championships
1986–1987
1st Cyclo-cross de Harnes
1987–1988
1st National Amateur Championships
1st Overall Challenge National
1988–1989
1st National Amateur Championships
1989–1990
3rd UCI World Championships
3rd National Championships
1990–1991
1st National Championships
1st Overall Challenge National
3rd UCI World Championships

=== MTB ===
1988
1st Transvésubienne
1990
1st Roc d'Azur
1992
1st National XCO Championships
1st Transvésubienne
1993
1st Roc d'Azur

=== Road ===
1992
2nd Grand Prix de la ville de Nogent-sur-Oise
