= Julien Belgy =

French cyclist (born 1983)

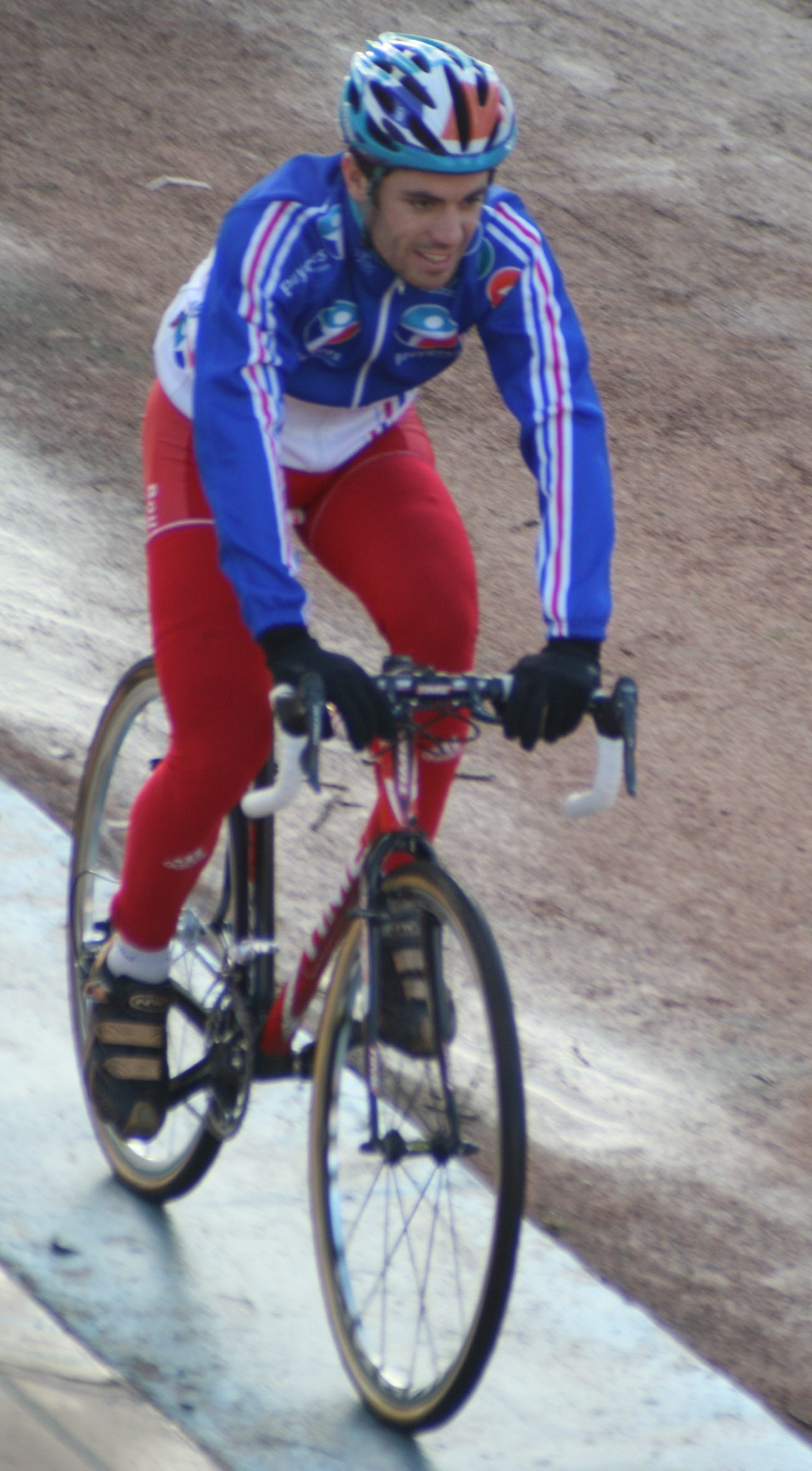

Personal information
- Full name: Julien Belgy
- Born: 6 May 1983 (age 43) Niort, France
- Height: 1.75 m (5 ft 9 in)
- Weight: 68 kg (150 lb)

Cycling career
- Sport: Cycling
- Current team: Retired
- Disciplines: Road; Cyclo-cross
- Role: Rider

Professional team
- 2007–2009: Bouygues Télécom

Julien Belgy (born 6 May 1983 in Niort, Deux-Sèvres) is a French former professional cyclo-cross and road cyclist.

== Major results ==
=== Cyclo-cross ===
2001-2001
France U19 Cyclo-Cross Champion
2002–2003
2nd, National U23 Cyclo-Cross Championship
2003–2004
2nd, National U23 Cyclo-Cross Championship
2004–2005
3rd, National U23 Cyclo-Cross Championship
2005–2006
1st in Buxerolles
2007–2008
1st, Overall, Tour du Val d'Orge

1st, Stages 1 & 3

1st in Pageas, Dijon, Camors & Lanarvily

=== Road ===
2005
1st, Stage 8, Tour de la Guadeloupe
