= Julien Loisel =

French cyclist

Personal information
- Born: 10 September 1890
- Died: 31 May 1963 (aged 72)

Cycling career
- Sport: Cycling
- Role: Rider

Julien Loisel (10 September 1890 – 31 May 1963) was a French racing cyclist. He rode in the 1920 Tour de France.
