= Émilien Viennet =

French cyclist

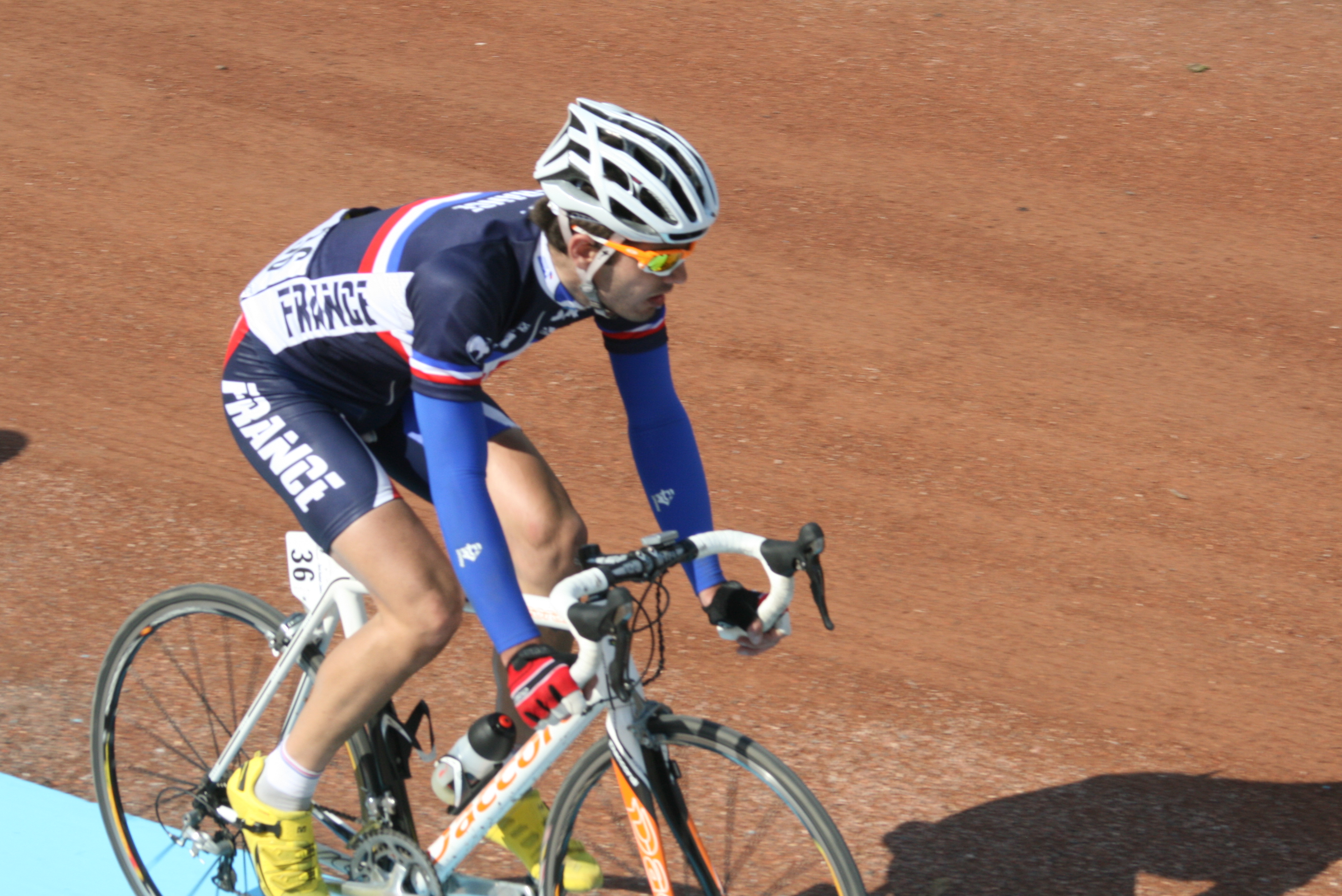
- Viennet at the 2010 Paris-Roubaix juniors

Personal information
- Born: 6 February 1992 (age 34) Besançon, France

Cycling career
- Sport: Cycling
- Disciplines: Road, cyclo-cross
- Role: Rider

Amateur team
- 2010–2012: CC Étupes

Professional team
- 2012–2014: FDJ–BigMat

Émilien Viennet (born 6 February 1992 in Besançon) is a French cyclist who rode for FDJ.fr. He is a specialist in both road and cyclo-cross.

== Palmarés ==
2009
4th Tour d'Istrie
2010
2nd 2010 European Road Championships junior time trial
2nd Junior National Time Trial Championships
2011
2nd Ronde du Pays basque
