= Robert Oubron =

French cyclist

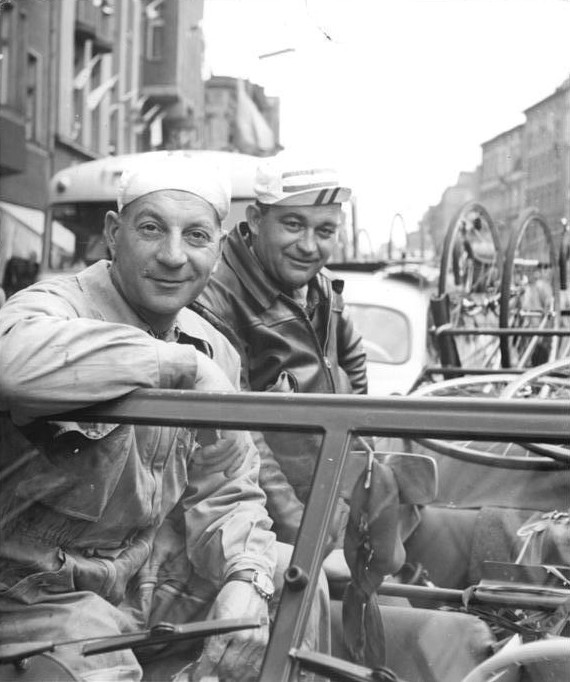

Personal information
- Born: 18 April 1913
- Died: 7 February 1989 (aged 75)

Cycling career
- Sport: Cycling
- Discipline: Road
- Role: Rider

Robert Oubron (18 April 1913 – 7 February 1989) was a French racing cyclist. He rode in the 1937 Tour de France.
