= 2018 UCI Cyclo-cross World Championships =

- Location within Netherlands
- Venue: Valkenburg, Netherlands
- Date: 3–4 February 2018
- Coordinates: 50°52′N 5°50′E
- Events: 5

The 2018 UCI Cyclo-cross World Championships were the World Championship for cyclo-cross for the season 2017–18. These were held in Valkenburg in the Netherlands on Saturday 3 and Sunday 4 February 2018. The championships featured five events; men's races for elite, under-23 and junior riders, and women's races for elite and under-23 riders.

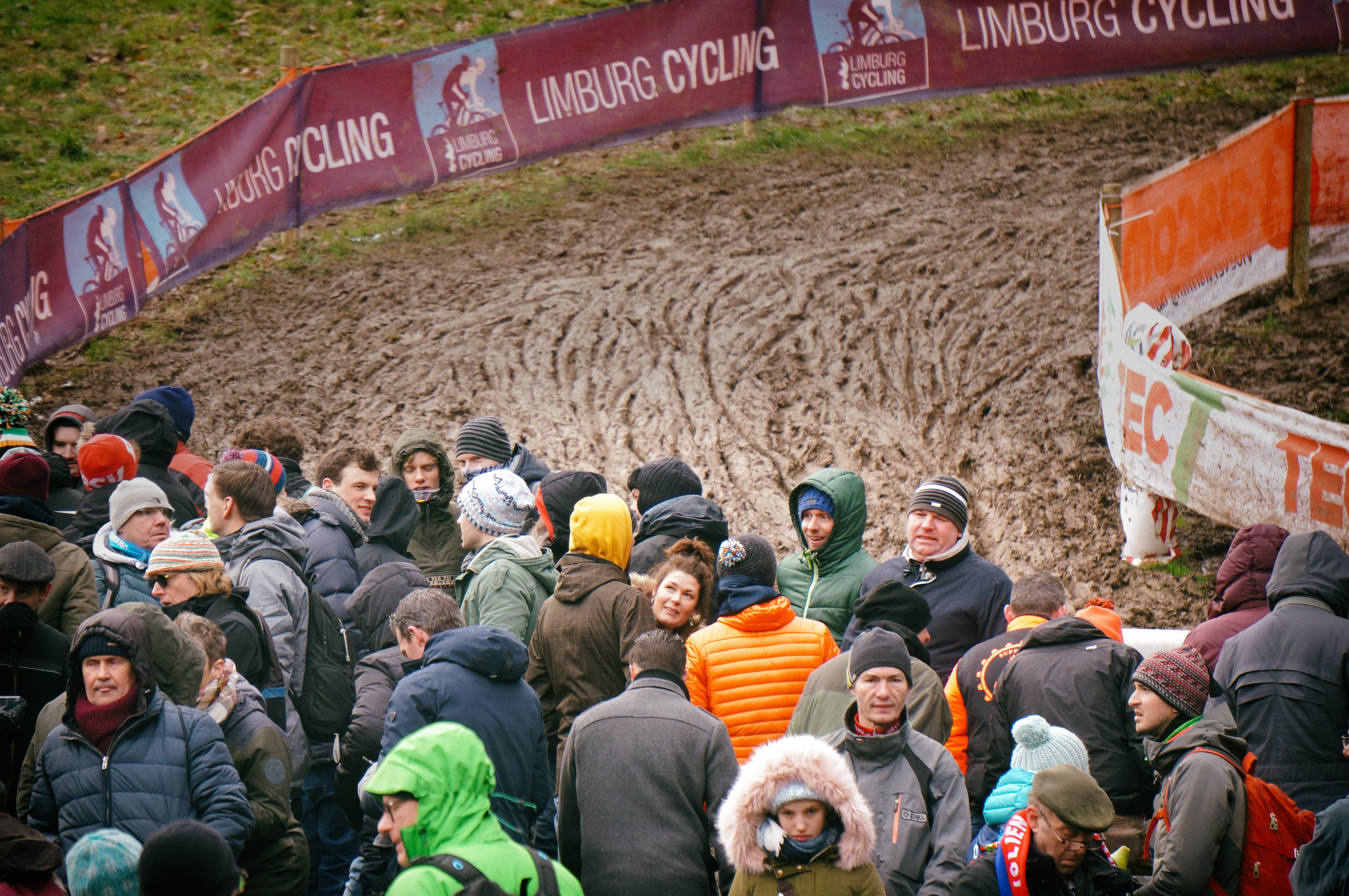
2018 Cyclo-cross World Championships

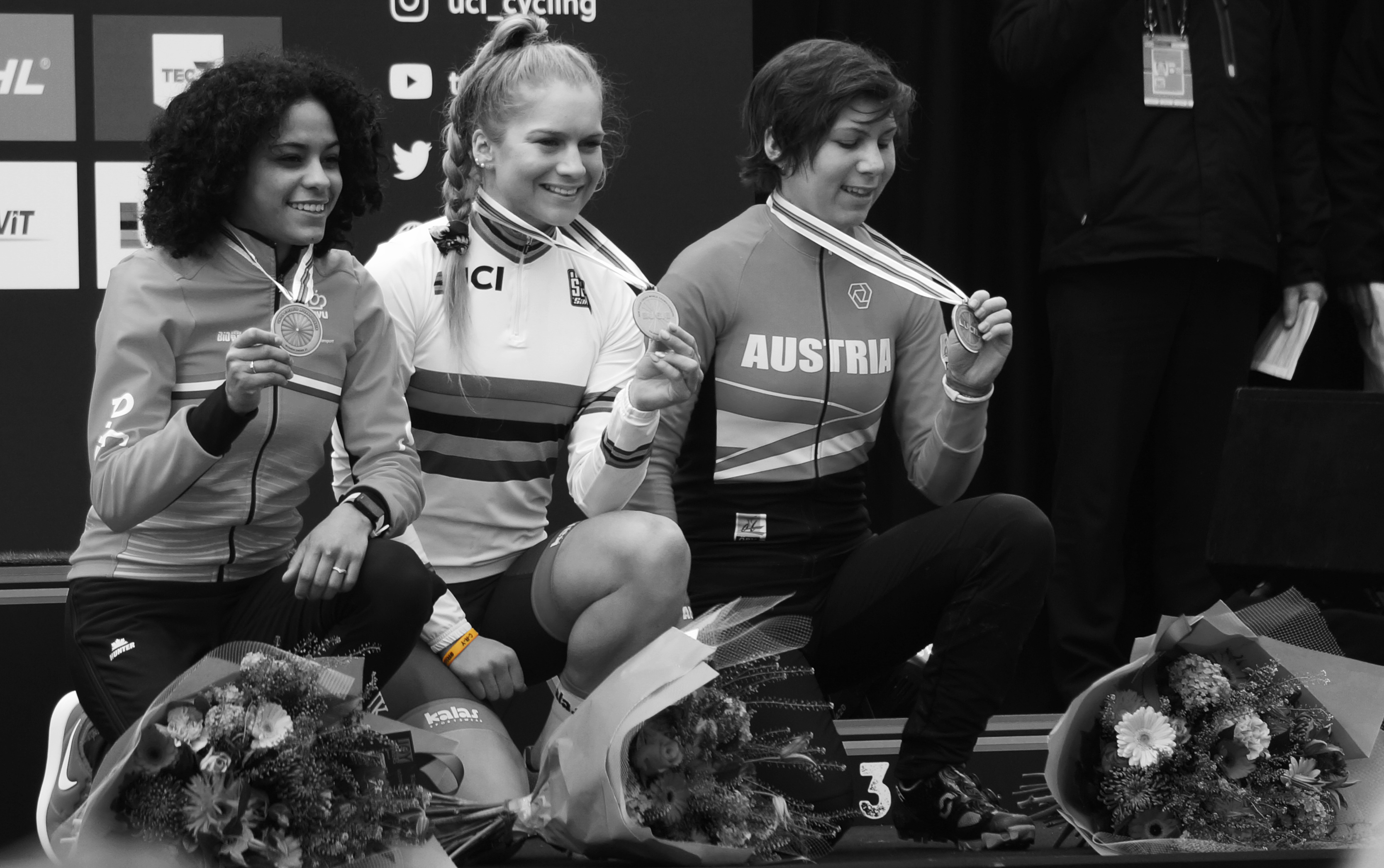
Ceylin del Carmen Alvarado, Evie Richards and Nadja Heigl (Women's under-23 race)

== Schedule ==
Saturday 3 February 2018

- 11:00 Men's Junior
- 13:00 Women's Under 23
- 15:00 Women's Elite

Sunday 4 February 2018

- 11:00 Men's Under 23
- 15:00 Men's Elite

All times in local time (UTC+1).

== Medal summary ==
=== Medalists ===
Event	Gold		Silver		Bronze	
Men's events
Men's elite race	Wout van Aert; Belgium	1h 09' 00"	Michael Vanthourenhout; Belgium	+ 2' 13"	Mathieu van der Poel; Netherlands	+ 2' 30"
Men's under-23 race	Eli Iserbyt; Belgium	50' 54"	Joris Nieuwenhuis; Netherlands	+ 28"	Yan Gras; France	+ 35"
Men's junior race	Ben Tulett; Great Britain	41' 19"	Tomáš Kopecký; Czech Republic	+ 22"	Ryan Kamp; Netherlands	+ 30"
Women's events
Women's elite race	Sanne Cant; Belgium	49' 34"	Katie Compton; United States	+ 12"	Lucinda Brand; Netherlands	+ 26"
Women's under-23 race	Evie Richards; Great Britain	37' 52"	Ceylin del Carmen Alvarado; Netherlands	+ 38"	Nadja Heigl; Austria	+ 1' 04"

=== Medals table ===
* Host nation (Netherlands)

Rank	Nation	Gold	Silver	Bronze	Total
1	Belgium (BEL)	3	1	0	4
2	Great Britain (GBR)	2	0	0	2
3	Netherlands (NED)	0	2	3	5
4	Czech Republic (CZE)	0	1	0	1
4	United States (USA)	0	1	0	1
6	Austria (AUT)	0	0	1	1
6	France (FRA)	0	0	1	1
Totals (7 entries)		5	5	5	15
