= Cyrille Bonnand =

French bicycle racer

Personal information
- Born: 5 August 1970 (age 56) Albi, France

Cycling career
- Sport: Cycling
- Current team: Retired
- Disciplines: Cyclo-cross; Mountain bike
- Role: Rider
- Rider type: Cross-country

Professional teams
- 1996: Scott
- 1997: Volvo–Cannondale
Medal record
Representing France
Men's Mountain bike marathon
European Championships
Bronze medal – third place	1995 Špindlerův Mlýn	Cross-country

Cyrille Bonnand (born 5 August 1970) is a French former professional cyclo-cross cyclist and cross-country mountain biker. He notably finished third at the European Cross-country Championships in 1995 and won the French national cross-country championships in 1997. In 2009, he was suspended for 4 years for testing positive for EPO, which ended his career.

== Major results ==
=== Cyclo-cross ===
1991–1992
UCI World Cup

1st Hoogerheide

1993–1994
6th UCI World Championships
2000–2001
2nd National Championships
2008–2009
1st Cyclocross International de Lanarvily

=== Mountain bike ===
1996
3rd European XCO Championships
1997
1st National XCO Championships
