= Roger Lacolle =

French cyclist

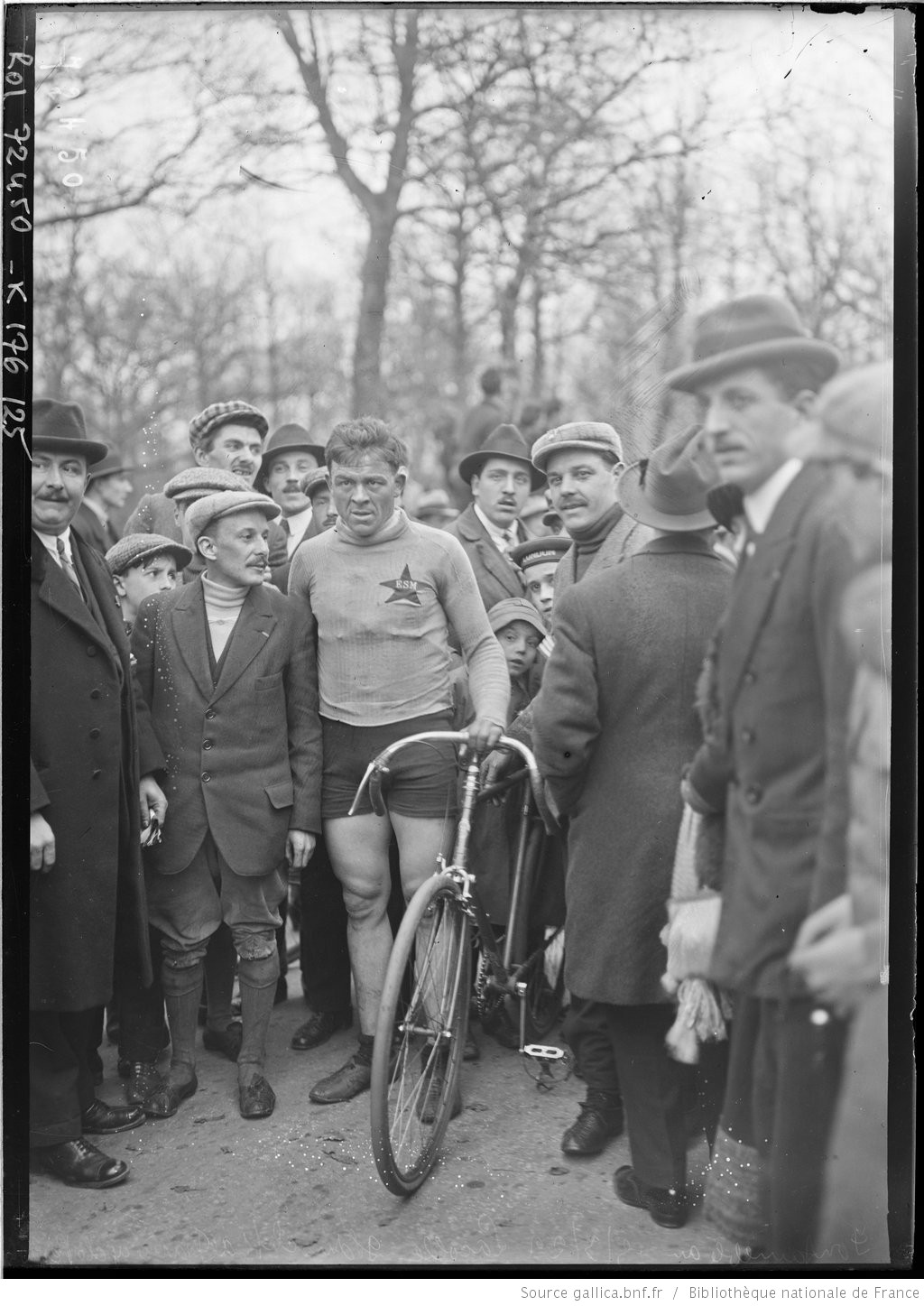

Personal information
- Born: 8 January 1898
- Died: 8 March 1973 (aged 75)

Cycling career
- Sport: Cycling
- Discipline: Road
- Role: Rider

Roger Lacolle (8 January 1898 – 8 March 1973) was a French racing cyclist. He rode in the 1923 Tour de France.
