= Camille Foucaux =

French cyclist

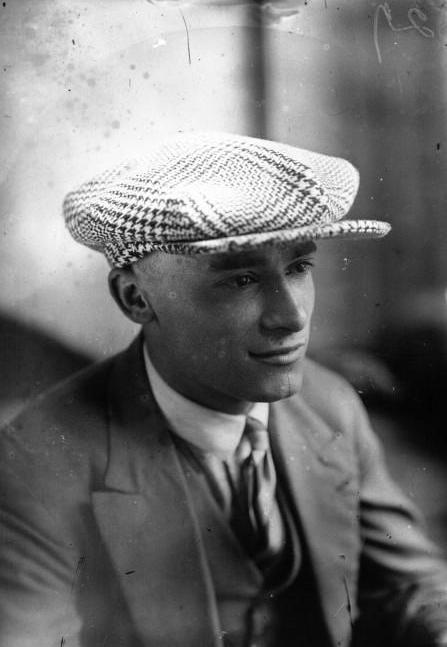

Personal information
- Born: 22 April 1906
- Died: 21 October 1976 (aged 70)

Cycling career
- Sport: Cycling
- Discipline: Road
- Role: Rider

Camille Foucaux (22 April 1906 – 21 October 1976) was a French racing cyclist. He rode in the 1929 Tour de France.
