= André Vanderdonckt =

French cyclist

André Vanderdonckt was a French cyclist, born 29 February 1908 in Flers-lez-Lille, died 5 August 1982 in Wattrelos. He was a professional 1927–1935.

== Honours ==
- Grand Prix de Fourmies (1931)
- French cyclo-cross champion (1933)
- Paris-Angers (1934)
- Paris-Dunkerque (1935)
