= Hofstade, Flemish Brabant =

Coordinates: 50.9915°N 4.4926°E

Hofstade is a village in the municipality of Zemst, Flemish Brabant, Belgium.

== History ==
Hofstade was part of the municipality of Muizen, until it became an independent community in 1870. It remained independent until it became a part of Zemst in 1977. The church was only built in the late 20th century.
