= Georges Gatier =

French cyclist

Personal information
- Born: 17 March 1893
- Died: 11 July 1955 (aged 62)

Cycling career
- Sport: Cycling
- Discipline: Road
- Role: Rider

Georges Gatier (17 March 1893 – 11 July 1955) was a French racing cyclist. He rode in the 1924 Tour de France.
