= Maryline Salvetat =

French cyclist

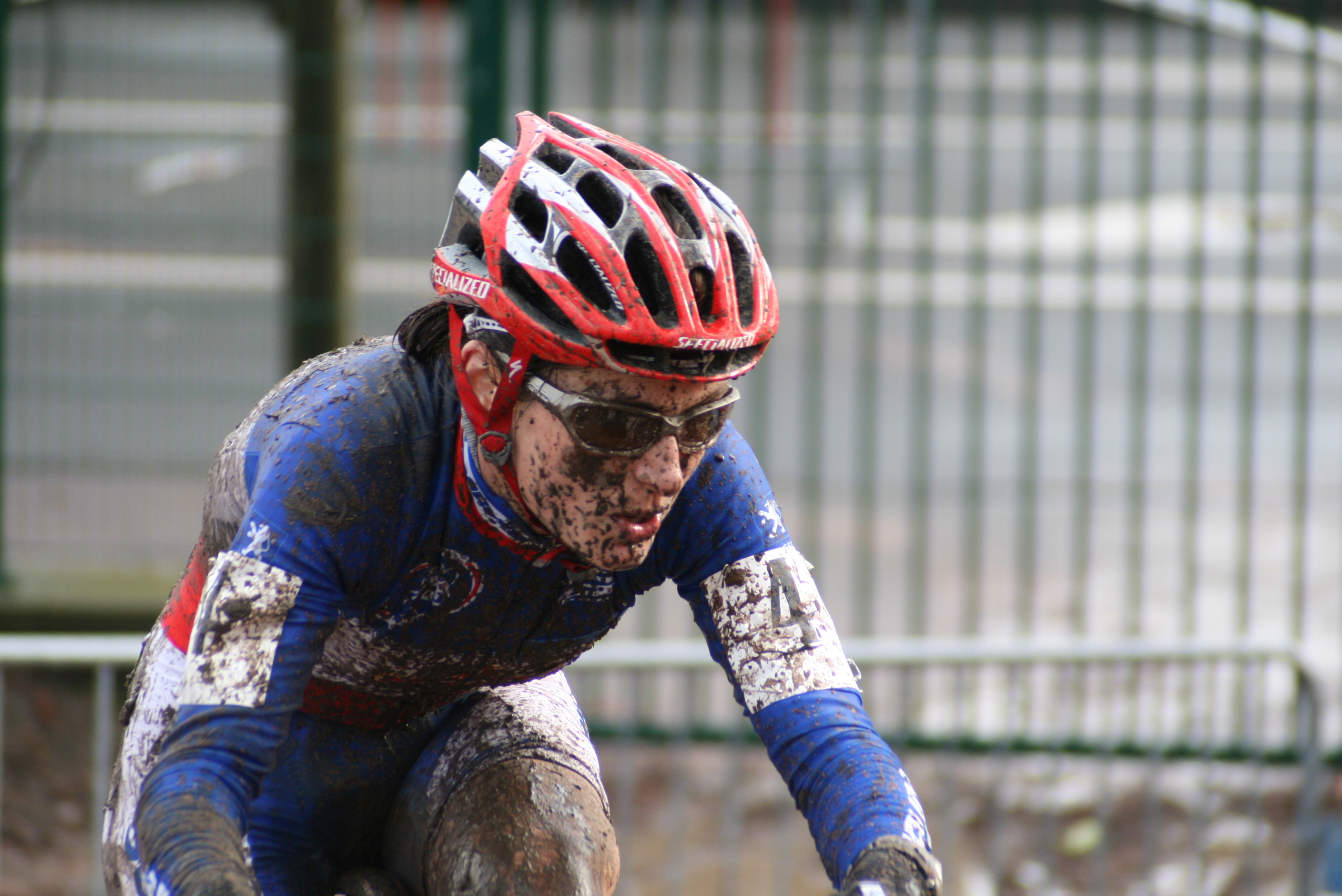
- At the 2009 Cyclo-cross Grand Prix Lille Métropole

Personal information
- Full name: Maryline Salvetat
- Born: 12 February 1974 (age 52) Castres, France

Cycling career
- Sport: Cycling
- Disciplines: Road & cyclo-cross
- Role: Rider
Medal record
Representing France
Women's Cyclo-cross
UCI Cyclo-cross World Championships
Gold medal – first place	2007	Women elite race
Silver medal – second place	2004	Women elite race

Maryline Salvetat (French: [maʁilin salvəta]; born 12 February 1974) is a French cyclist born in Castres. She participates in road cycling as well as in cyclo-cross and mountain biking. In 2002, 2004, and 2005 she became French national champion in cyclo-cross. In 2004, she also won the silver medal at the cyclo-cross European and World Championships.

== Honours ==
=== Road cycling ===
1991
France U19 Road Race Champion
1992
France U19 Road Race Champion
1994
2nd, Grand Prix de France
3rd, Chrono des Herbiers
1995
2nd, Grand Prix de France
1996
1st, Grand Prix de France
2nd, Chrono des Herbiers
1997
2nd, Chrono des Herbiers
1998
3rd, Grand Prix de France
2003
2nd, French National Championship
2006
1st, Trophée des Grimpeurs
2nd, Overall, Grande Boucle Féminine Internationale
3rd, French Time Trial Championship
2007
France French Time Trial Champion
3rd, Overall, Route de France Féminine

=== Cyclo-cross ===
2001
2nd, French National Championship
2nd, Liévin
2002
France Cyclo-Cross Champion
2nd, Lapalisse
2nd, Sedan
2003
1st, Liévin
1st, Athée-sur-Cher
1st, Sedan
2nd, French National Championship
2nd, Koksijde
2nd, Wetzikon
3rd, Sankt-Wendel
2004
France Cyclo-Cross Champion
(silver) World Cyclo-Cross Championship
(silver) European Cyclo-Cross Championship
1st, Bollène
1st, Sedan
1st, Lons-le-Saunier
2nd, Nommay
2nd, Milan
2nd, Hofstade
2005
France Cyclo-Cross Champion
1st, Athée-sur-Cher
2nd, Fourmies
3rd, Nommay
3rd, Pijnacker
3rd, Hofstade
2006
1st, Nommay
2nd, French National Championship
2nd, Blaye
2007
Cyclo-Cross World Champion
France Cyclo-Cross Champion
(silver) European Cyclo-Cross Championship
1st, Grand Prix du Nouvel-An
1st, Sarrebourg
1st, Hofstade
2nd, Nommay
2nd, Gavere-Asper
2nd, Quelneuc
3rd, Koksijde
2008
1st, Grand Prix du Nouvel-An
2nd, French National Championship
2nd, Liévin
2nd, Hoogerheide

=== Mountain biking ===
2005
2nd, French National Championship
