= Maurice Laine =

French cyclist

Personal information
- Born: 10 May 1895
- Died: 2 October 1962 (aged 67)

Cycling career
- Sport: Cycling
- Discipline: Road
- Role: Rider

Maurice Laine (10 May 1895 – 2 October 1962) was a French racing cyclist. He rode in the 1923 Tour de France.
