= Jean-Michel Richeux =

French cyclist

Personal information
- Born: 9 November 1948 (age 77)

Cycling career
- Sport: Cycling

Jean-Michel Richeux (born 9 November 1948) is a French former cyclist. He competed in the team time trial event at the 1976 Summer Olympics.
