= Arnaud Labbe =

French cyclist

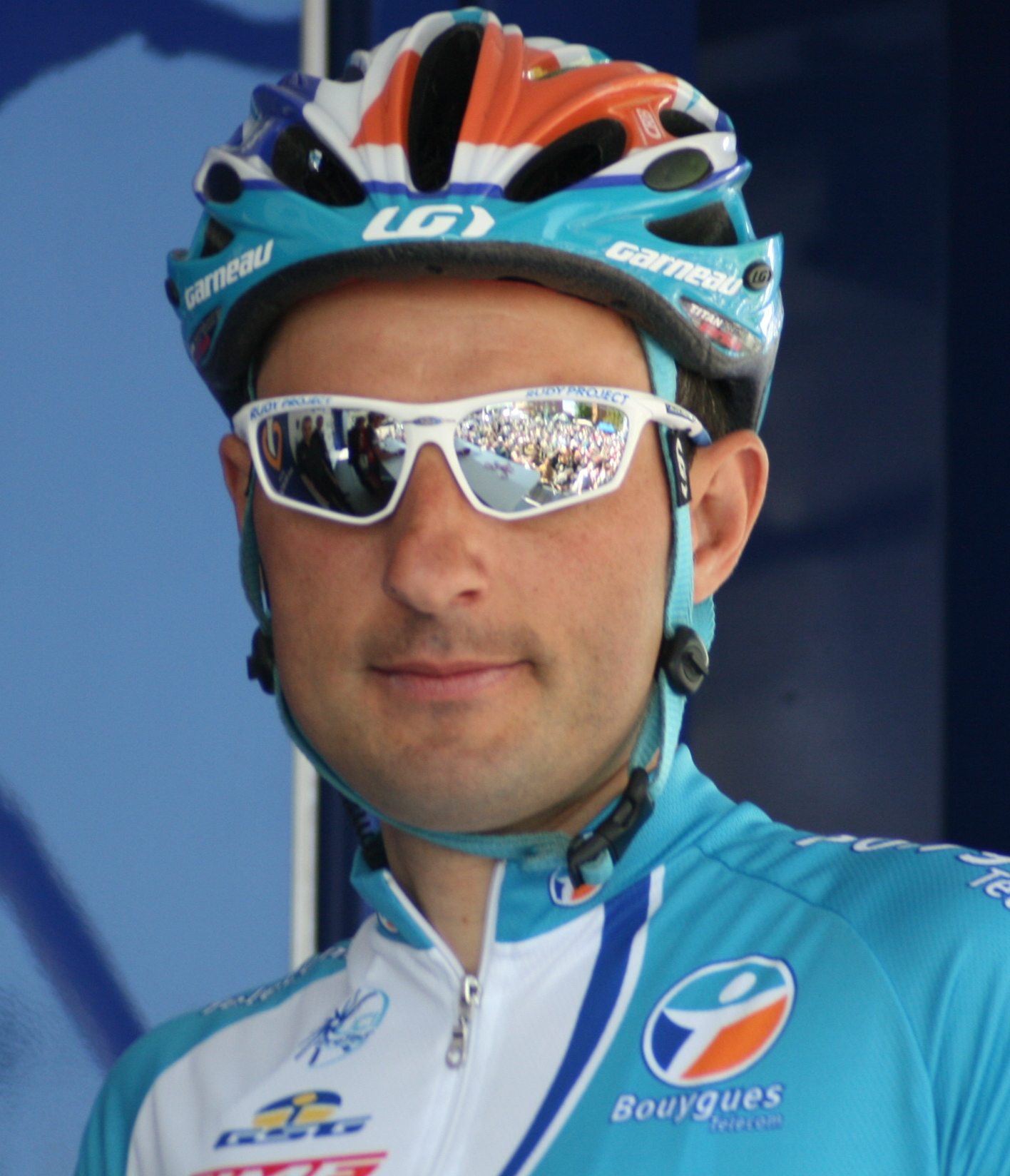

Personal information
- Full name: Arnaud Labbe
- Born: 3 November 1976 (age 49) Creil, France
- Height: 1.83 m (6 ft 0 in)
- Weight: 73 kg (161 lb)

Cycling career
- Sport: Cycling
- Current team: CC Périgueux Dordogne
- Disciplines: Road and cyclo-cross
- Role: Rider

Amateur teams
- 2001: Cycle Poitevin
- 2010: GSC Blagnac
- 2014–: CC Périgueux Dordogne

Professional teams
- 2005: Auber 93
- 2006–2009: Bouygues Télécom
- 2010–2013: Cofidis

Arnaud Labbe (born 3 November 1976 in Creil, Oise) is a French racing cyclist who rides for the CC Périgueux Dordogne team. He had started the 2010 season riding for an amateur team, GSC Blagnac, having failed to earn a renewal of his contract with Bbox Bouygues Telecom at the end of the previous season, but Cofidis were left short of riders due to injuries and illness, and needed to expand their squad. Labbe competes in road and cyclo-cross events.

For the 2014 season, Labbe returned to the amateur ranks with CC Périgueux Dordogne.

== Palmares ==
=== Cyclo-cross ===
2002–2003
3rd National Championships
2003–2004
2nd National Championships
2004–2005
3rd National Championships
2005–2006
3rd National Championships

=== Road ===
2001
9th Manx International
2002
7th Manx International
2003
1st Prix des Flandres Françaises
4th Manx International
2005
2nd Overall Tour de la Manche

1st Stage 2

3rd Overall Étoile de Bessèges
5th Flèche Hesbigonne
6th Overall Tour de la Somme
8th La Poly Normande
9th Overall Tour de Normandie
10th Bordeaux-Saintes

Grand Tour general classification results timeline
Grand Tour	2006	2007	2008	2009	2010	2011	2012	2013
Giro d'Italia	116	DNF	—	—	—	—	—	—
Tour de France	—	—	—	—	—	—	—	—
Vuelta a España	—	—	108	—	154	—	—	—

Legend
—	Did not compete
DNF	Did not finish
