= Arnold Jeannesson =

French cyclist (born 1986)

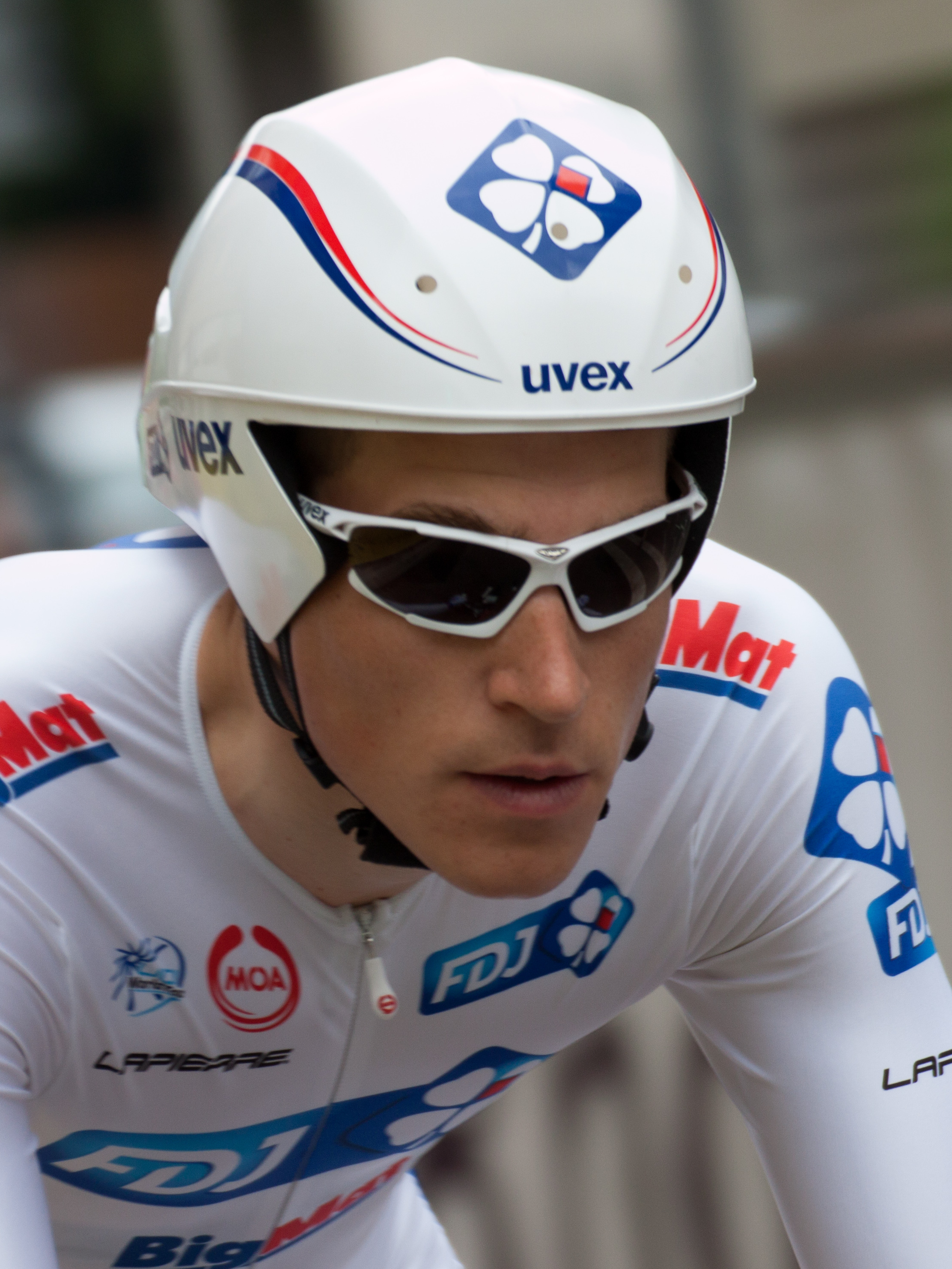
- Jeannesson at the 2012 Critérium du Dauphiné

Personal information
- Full name: Arnold Jeannesson
- Born: 15 January 1986 (age 40) Challans, France
- Height: 1.82 m (6 ft 0 in)
- Weight: 65 kg (143 lb; 10.2 st)

Cycling career
- Sport: Cycling
- Current team: Retired
- Disciplines: Road; Cyclo-cross
- Role: Rider
- Rider type: Climber

Amateur teams
- 2005: VC Chalandais
- 2006–2007: CM Aubervilliers 93
- 2006: Auber 93 (stagiaire)
- 2007: Auber 93 (stagiaire)

Professional teams
- 2008: Auber 93
- 2009–2010: Caisse d'Epargne
- 2011–2015: FDJ
- 2016: Cofidis
- 2017: Fortuneo–Vital Concept

Arnold Jeannesson (born 15 January 1986 in Challans) is a French former road bicycle racer who competed professionally between 2008 and 2017. He previously specialised in cyclo-cross and mountain biking. Jeannesson wore the white jersey of the highest placed rider under the age of 26 for two days in the 2011 Tour de France. In October 2015, Cofidis announced that Jeannesson would be part of their squad for 2016. Jeannesson announced in August 2017 that he would end his professional career on the road at the end of the season 2017.

== Major results ==
=== Road ===
2007
1st Stage 4 Tour de la Manche
2008
1st Stage 3b Tour de la Manche
3rd Overall Tour de l'Avenir

1st Stage 8

6th Tour du Finistère
6th Boucles de l'Aulne
8th Grand Prix de Plumelec-Morbihan
2011
3rd Tro-Bro Léon
Tour de France

Held after Stages 12–13

2012
5th Overall Tour of Oman
6th Overall Paris–Nice
2013
5th Tour du Finistère
10th Clásica de San Sebastián
2016
4th Overall Critérium International
2017
9th Overall Tour du Haut Var
2018
1st Overall Transmaurienne Vanoise

==== Grand Tour general classification results timeline ====
Grand Tour	2009	2010	2011	2012	2013	2014	2015	2016
Giro d'Italia	57	DNF	—	—	DNF	—	—	—
Tour de France	—	—	15	—	29	30	—	87
Vuelta a España	—	—	—	64	—	—	—	—

Legend
—	Did not compete
DNF	Did not finish

=== Cyclo-cross ===
2006–2007
3rd National Under-23 Championships
2007–2008
Challenge la France

3rd Cap d'Agde

2010–2011
3rd National Championships
2011–2012
1st Cyclo-cross International du Mingant Lanarvily
2012–2013
1st Cyclo-cross International du Mingant Lanarvily
2nd National Championships
2013–2014
1st Sablé-sur-Sarthe
Challenge la France

2nd Flamanville

2016–2017
2nd National Championships
Coupe de France

3rd Nommay

2017–2018
3rd National Championships
Coupe de France

3rd Flamanville
