= Laurence Leboucher =

French cyclist

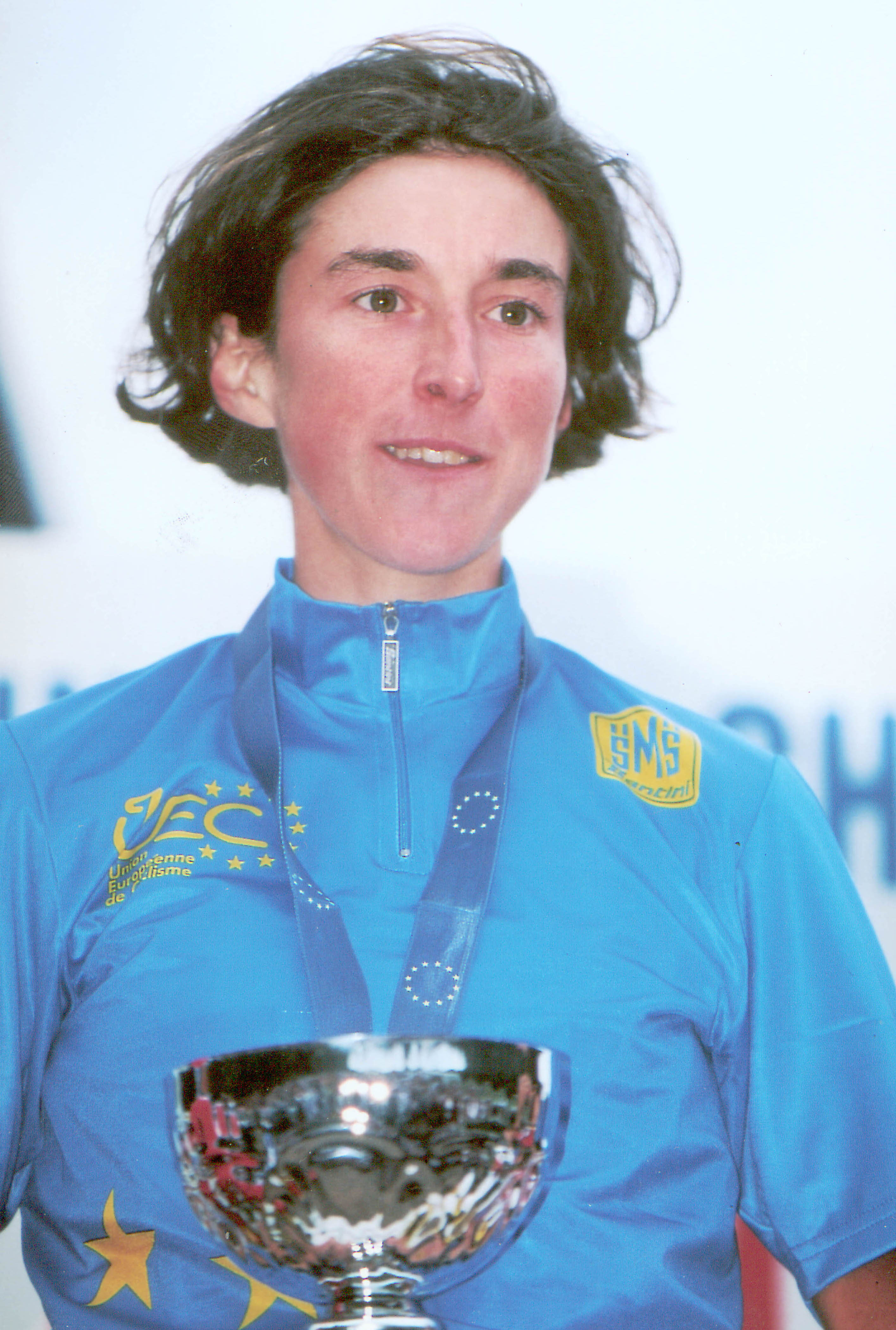
- Winner of the cross-country event at the 1998 European Mountain Bike Championships

Personal information
- Full name: Laurence Leboucher
- Born: 22 February 1972 (age 54) Alençon, France

Cycling career
- Sport: Cycling
- Disciplines: MTB & cyclo-cross
- Role: Rider
Medal record
Representing France
Women's Cyclo-cross
UCI Cyclo-cross World Championships
Gold medal – first place	2002	Women elite race
Gold medal – first place	2004	Women elite race
Bronze medal – third place	2003	Women elite race
Bronze medal – third place	2007	Women elite race
Bronze medal – third place	2008	Women elite race

Laurence Leboucher (born 22 February 1972 in Alençon, Orne) is a French professional cross-country mountain bike and cyclo-cross racer. She is a three-time Olympian and two-time world cyclo-cross champion.

== Major achievements ==
Important results for Laurence Leboucher are:

1998

- 1st (Gold Medal), World Mountain Bike Championships, Cross Country
- 1st, European Cyclo-cross Championships

2000

- 1st, European Cyclo-cross Championships
- 3rd, Round 2, Tissot-UCI Mountain Bike World Cup

2001

- 1st, European Cyclo-cross Championships

2002

- 1st (Gold Medal), World Cyclo-cross Championships

2003

- 3rd (Bronze Medal), World Cyclo-cross Championships

2004

- 1st (Gold Medal), World Cyclo-cross Championships

2005

- 2nd, French Cyclo-cross Championships

Sporting positions
Preceded by (Italy) Paola Pezzo	World Mountain Bike (Cross Country) Champion; 1998	Succeeded by (Spain) Margarita Fullana
