= Lucie Chainel-Lefèvre =

French cyclist

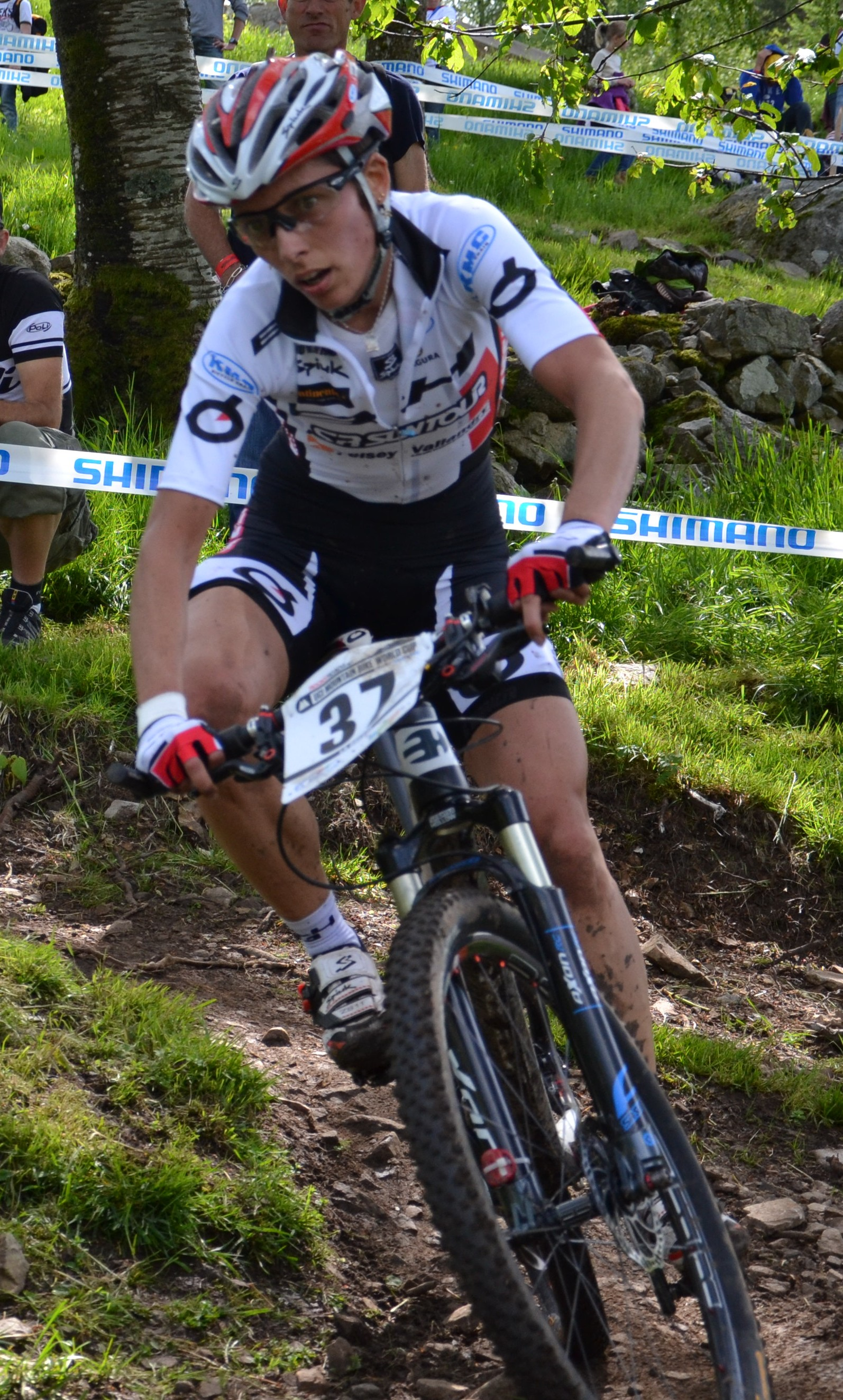
- At a race in 2012

Personal information
- Full name: Lucie Chainel-Lefèvre
- Born: 2 July 1983 (age 43)

Cycling career
- Sport: Cycling
- Discipline: Cyclo-cross
- Role: Rider
Medal record
Representing France
Women's cyclo-cross
World Championships
Bronze medal – third place	2013 Louisville	Elite women
European Cyclo-cross Championships
Silver medal – second place	2011 Lucca	Elite women
Bronze medal – third place	2013 Mladá Boleslav	Elite women

Lucie Chainel-Lefèvre (born 2 July 1983) is a French cyclo-cross racing cyclist. She won the bronze medal at the 2013 UCI Cyclo-cross World Championships in Louisville, United States. She was married to racing cyclist Steve Chainel but they separated in 2017.
