= Pontchâteau =

- Commune
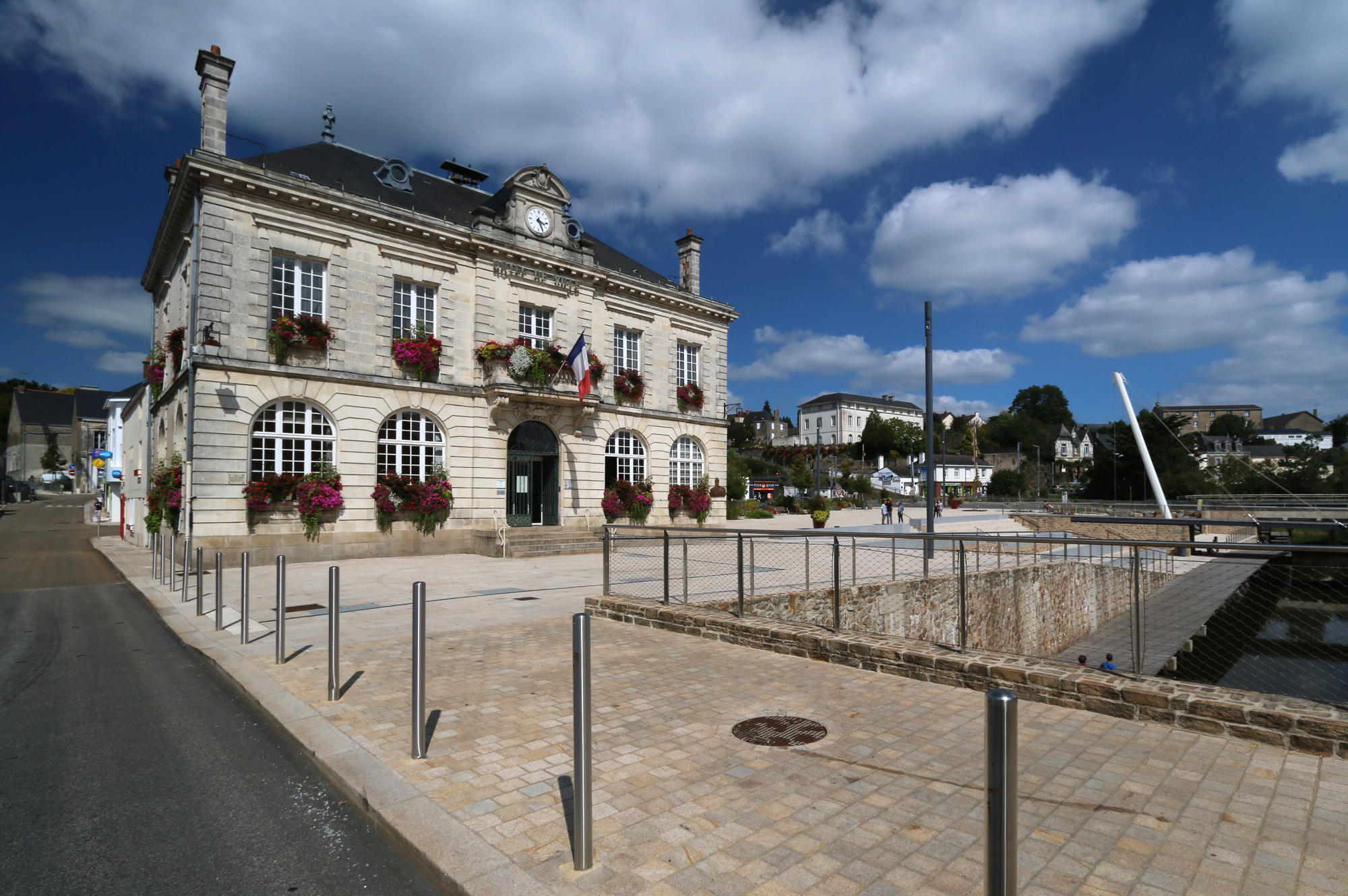
- Town hall

- Coat of arms
- Location of Pontchâteau
- Location within France Location within Pays de la Loire
- Coordinates: 47°25′48″N 2°04′59″W
- Country: France
- Region: Pays de la Loire
- Department: Loire-Atlantique
- Arrondissement: Saint-Nazaire
- Canton: Pontchâteau
- Intercommunality: Pays de Pontchâteau St-Gildas-des-Bois

Government
  - Mayor (2020–2026): Danielle Cornet
- Area^{1}: 55.79 km^{2} (21.54 sq mi)
- Elevation: 7 m (23 ft)
- Highest elevation: 52 m (171 ft)
- Lowest elevation: 0 m (0 ft)
- Population (2023): 11,474
  - Density: 205.7/km^{2} (532.7/sq mi)
- Time zone: UTC+01:00 (CET)
  - Summer (DST): UTC+02:00 (CEST)
- INSEE/Postal code: 44129 /44160
- ^{1} French Land Register data, which excludes lakes, ponds, glaciers > 1 km^{2} (0.386 sq mi or 247 acres) and river estuaries.

Pontchâteau (French pronunciation: [pɔ̃ʃato]; Breton: Pontkastell-Keren) is a commune in the Loire-Atlantique department in western France.

== Geography ==
Pontchâteau is located in the northwest of Loire-Atlantique, 19 km southeast of La Roche-Bernard (Morbihan), 30 km south of Redon (Ille-et-Vilaine), 25 km east of Saint-Nazaire and 53 km northwest of Nantes. The town is crossed by the Brivet.

== Population ==
Historical population

Year	Pop.	±% p.a.
1793	2,703	—
1800	2,572	−0.71%
1806	2,678	+0.68%
1821	3,100	+0.98%
1831	3,300	+0.63%
1841	3,516	+0.64%
1846	3,558	+0.24%
1851	3,667	+0.61%
1856	3,709	+0.23%
1861	4,449	+3.71%
1866	4,158	−1.34%
1872	4,200	+0.17%
1876	4,368	+0.99%
1881	4,481	+0.51%
1886	4,656	+0.77%
1891	4,632	−0.10%
1896	4,814	+0.77%
1901	4,892	+0.32%

Year	Pop.	±% p.a.
1906	5,004	+0.45%
1911	4,883	−0.49%
1921	4,675	−0.43%
1926	4,613	−0.27%
1931	4,606	−0.03%
1936	4,518	−0.39%
1946	5,188	+1.39%
1954	5,200	+0.03%
1962	5,334	+0.32%
1968	5,835	+1.51%
1975	6,394	+1.32%
1982	7,220	+1.75%
1990	7,549	+0.56%
1999	7,773	+0.33%
2007	9,140	+2.05%
2012	9,982	+1.78%
2017	10,684	+1.37%
2023	11,474	+1.20%

Source: EHESS and INSEE (1968-2023)

== Communications ==
Pontchâteau is located at a major crossroads, at the junction of the RN 165, the Nantes-Vannes-Brest expressway, and the D 773, the Saint-Nazaire-Redon road.

Pontchâteau also lies on the Savenay–Landerneau railway line, and is served by a station.

== Personalities ==
- Jacques Demy (1931–1990), film director.
- Lydie Denier (1964–), actress.

== See also ==
- Communes of the Loire-Atlantique department
