= Caroline Mani =

French cyclist

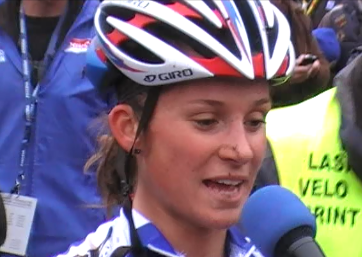
- At the 2012 French national cyclo-cross championships

Personal information
- Born: 18 January 1987 (age 39) Besançon, France

Cycling career
- Sport: Cycling
- Discipline: Cyclo-cross
- Role: Rider
Medal record
Representing France
Women's cyclo-cross
World Championships
Silver medal – second place	2016 Zolder	Elite Women
European Championships
Bronze medal – third place	2016 Pontchâteau	Elite Women

Caroline Mani (born 18 January 1987) is a French cyclo-cross racing cyclist. A five-time French National Champion, she won the silver medal at the 2016 UCI Cyclo-cross World Championships in Zolder, Belgium. Caroline has been one of the more consistent performers in the world and domestic American cyclocross circuits amassing dozens of podium finishes. She won the 2021 and 2022 USCX Series titles.
