= 2021 Arkéa–Samsic (men's team) season =

Arkéa–Samsic
- 2021 season
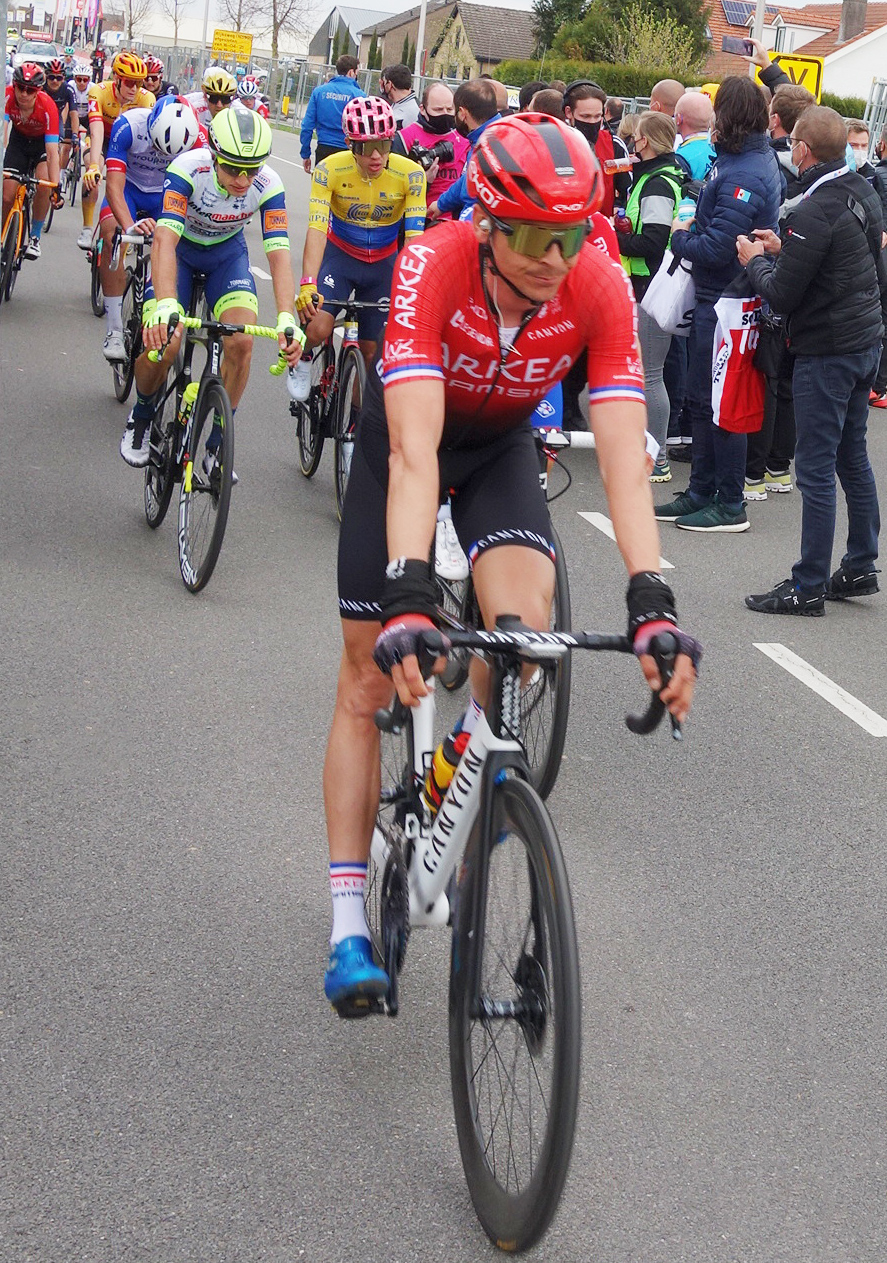
- Warren Barguil at the Amstel Gold Race
- UCI code: ARK
- Status: UCI ProTeam
- World Tour Rank: 17th
- Manager: Emmanuel Hubert (FRA)
- Main sponsor(s): Crédit mutuel Arkéa; Samsic
- Based: France
- Bicycles: Canyon
- Groupset: Shimano

Season victories
- One-day races: 5
- Stage race overall: 3
- Stage race stages: 2
- Most wins: Nairo Quintana (COL); Connor Swift (GBR); (2 each)
- Best ranked rider: Nairo Quintana (COL) (64th)
- Jersey

The 2021 season for Arkéa–Samsic was the 18th season in the team's existence, the 11th as a UCI ProTeam, and the third under the current name.

== Team roster ==
As of 1 August 2021.

Rider	Date of birth
Winner Anacona (COL)	11 August 1988 (aged 32)
Warren Barguil (FRA)	28 October 1991 (aged 29)
Thomas Boudat (FRA)	24 February 1994 (aged 26)
Maxime Bouet (FRA)	3 November 1986 (aged 34)
Nacer Bouhanni (FRA)	25 July 1990 (aged 30)
Amaury Capiot (BEL)	25 June 1993 (aged 27)
Benjamin Declercq (BEL)	4 February 1994 (aged 26)
Anthony Delaplace (FRA)	11 September 1989 (aged 31)
Miguel Flórez (COL)	21 February 1996 (aged 24)
Élie Gesbert (FRA)	1 July 1995 (aged 25)
Donavan Grondin (FRA)	26 September 2000 (aged 20)
Thibault Guernalec (FRA)	31 July 1997 (aged 23)
Romain Hardy (FRA)	24 August 1988 (aged 32)
Mathis Le Berre (Note: Le Berre, Vauquelin, and Voisard joined as stagiaires on 1 August from Côtes d'Armor Cyclisme Marie Morin, VC Rouen 76, and the Swiss Racing Academy, respectively.) (FRA)	16 April 2001 (aged 19)
Kévin Ledanois (FRA)	13 July 1993 (aged 27)

Rider	Date of birth
Matis Louvel (FRA)	19 July 1999 (aged 21)
Daniel McLay (GBR)	3 January 1992 (aged 28)
Christophe Noppe (BEL)	29 November 1994 (aged 26)
Łukasz Owsian (POL)	24 February 1990 (aged 30)
Markus Pajur (EST)	23 September 2000 (aged 20)
Laurent Pichon (FRA)	19 July 1986 (aged 34)
Dayer Quintana (COL)	10 August 1992 (aged 28)
Nairo Quintana (COL)	4 February 1990 (aged 30)
Alan Riou (FRA)	2 April 1997 (aged 23)
Diego Rosa (ITA)	27 March 1989 (aged 31)
Clément Russo (FRA)	20 January 1995 (aged 25)
Connor Swift (GBR)	30 October 1995 (aged 25)
Kévin Vauquelin (FRA)	26 April 2001 (aged 19)
Yannis Voisard (SUI)	26 July 1998 (aged 22)
Bram Welten (NED)	29 March 1997 (aged 23)

Riders who joined the team for the 2021 season

Rider	2020 team
Amaury Capiot	Sport Vlaanderen–Baloise
Miguel Flórez	Androni Giocattoli–Sidermec
Markus Pajur	neo-pro (Tartu2024–BalticChainCycling.com)

Riders who left the team during or after the 2021 season

Rider	2021 team
Franck Bonnamour	B&B Hotels p/b KTM
Benoît Jarrier	Retired
Romain Le Roux	Retired
Florian Vachon	Retired

== Season victories ==
Date	Race	Competition	Rider	Country	Location	Ref.
30 April	Vuelta Asturias, Stage 1	UCI Europe Tour	Nairo Quintana (COL)	Spain	Pola de Lena	
2 May	Vuelta Asturias, Overall	UCI Europe Tour	Nairo Quintana (COL)	Spain		
9 May	Volta ao Algarve, Stage 5	UCI Europe Tour; UCI ProSeries	Élie Gesbert (FRA)	Portugal	Alto do Malhão	
15 May	Trofeo Andratx – Mirador d'Es Colomer (Puerto Pollença)	UCI Europe Tour	Winner Anacona (COL)	Spain	Mirador d'Es Colomer (Pollença)	
16 May	Tro-Bro Léon	UCI Europe Tour; UCI ProSeries	Connor Swift (GBR)	France	Lannilis	
29 July	Vuelta a Castilla y León	UCI Europe Tour	Matis Louvel (FRA)	Spain	Ponferrada	
20 August	Tour du Limousin, Overall	UCI Europe Tour	Warren Barguil (FRA)	France		
27 August	Tour Poitou-Charentes en Nouvelle-Aquitaine, Overall	UCI Europe Tour	Connor Swift (GBR)	France		
2 October	Classic Loire Atlantique	UCI Europe Tour	Alan Riou (FRA)	France	La Haye-Fouassière	
9 October	Tour de Vendée	UCI Europe Tour	Bram Welten (NED)	France	La Roche-sur-Yon	
