= 2008 UCI Cyclo-cross World Championships – Women's elite race =

Women's Elite Cyclo-cross Race
2008 UCI Cyclo-cross World Championships
- Rainbow jersey

Race details
- Dates: January 27, 2008
- Stages: 1
- Winning time: 45' 15"

Medalists
	Gold	Hanka Kupfernagel (GER)
	Silver	Marianne Vos (NED)
	Bronze	Laurence Leboucher (FRA)

This event was held on Sunday 27 January 2008 as a part of the 2008 UCI Cyclo-cross World Championships in Treviso, Italy.

== Ranking ==
Rank	Cyclist	Time
Gold medal	Hanka Kupfernagel (GER)	45:15.55
Silver medal	Marianne Vos (NED)	+ 0:13.98
Bronze medal	Laurence Leboucher (FRA)	+ 0:17.72
4	Christel Ferrier-Bruneau (FRA)	+ 0:26.31
5	Maryline Salvetat (FRA)	+ 0:52.48
6	Mirjam Melchers-Van Poppel (NED)	+ 0:58.08
7	Wendy Simms (CAN)	+ 1:04.01
8	Daphny Van Den Brand (NED)	+ 1:09.92
9	Rachel Lloyd (USA)	+ 1:23.64
10	Caroline Mani (FRA)	+ 1:42.40
11	Saskia Elemans (NED)	+ 1:45.07
12	Reza Hormes (NED)	+ 2:12.59
13	Stephanie Pohl (GER)	+ 2:14.45
14	Nadia Triquet-Claude (FRA)	+ 2:18.65
15	Sanne Van Paassen (NED)	+ 2:24.91
16	Pavla Havlikova (CZE)	+ 2:39.06
17	Susanne Juranek (GER)	+ 2:54.15
18	Helen Wyman (GBR)	+ 2:58.59
19	Vania Rossi (ITA)	+ 3:18.43
20	Kerry Barnholt (USA)	+ 3:18.83
21	Amy Dombroski (USA)	+ 3:44.62
22	Susan Butler (USA)	+ 3:53.66
23	Elke Riedl (AUT)	+ 4:44.47
24	Sanne Cant (BEL)	+ 4:54.28
25	Francesca Cucciniello (ITA)	+ 5:01.50
26	Daniela Bresciani (ITA)	+ 5:02.92
27	Loes Sels (BEL)	+ 5:10.80
28	Milena Cavani (ITA)	+ 5:15.06
29	Veerle Ingels (BEL)	+ 5:50.70
30	Kelly Jones (CAN)	+ 6:07.05
31	Mika Ogishima (JPN)	+ 6:19.26
32	Gabriella Day (GBR)	+ 6:40.51
33	Lise Müller (SUI)	+ 7:18.55
34	Masumi Sakai (JPN)	+ 8:05.81
35	Veronica Alessio (ITA)	+ 8:21.02
36	Ayako Toyooka (JPN)	+ 9:56.24

Two riders, Katie Compton and Birgit Hollmann, abandoned the race.
