= 2009 UCI Cyclo-cross World Championships – Women's elite race =

Women's Elite Cyclo-cross Race
2009 UCI Cyclo-cross World Championships
- Rainbow jersey

Race details
- Dates: February 1, 2009
- Stages: 1
- Winning time: 42' 39"

Medalists
	Gold	Marianne Vos (NED)
	Silver	Hanka Kupfernagel (GER)
	Bronze	Katie Compton (USA)

This event is a part of the 2009 UCI Cyclo-cross World Championships in Hoogerheide, Netherlands and was held on Sunday February 1, 2009. It was Marianne Vos' second victory in the Women's Elite.

== Ranking ==
Rank	Cyclist	Time
Gold medal	Marianne Vos (NED)	42:39
Silver medal	Hanka Kupfernagel (GER)	+ 0:01
Bronze medal	Katie Compton (USA)	+ 0:02
4	Sanne Van Paassen (NED)	+ 0:29
5	Caroline Mani (FRA)	+ 0:29
6	Sanne Cant (BEL)	+ 0:29
7	Daphny Van Den Brand (NED)	+ 0:30
8	Mirjam Melchers-Van Poppel (NED)	+ 0:30
9	Eva Lechner (ITA)	+ 0:31
10	Maryline Salvetat (FRA)	+ 0:31
11	Rachel Lloyd (USA)	+ 0:32
12	Christel Ferrier-Bruneau (FRA)	+ 0:37
13	Georgia Gould (USA)	+ 1:02
14	Nikki Harris (GBR)	+ 1:13
15	Joyce Vanderbeken (BEL)	+ 1:34
16	Helen Wyman (GBR)	+ 2:03
17	Susan Butler (USA)	+ 2:04
18	Wendy Simms (CAN)	+ 2:30
19	Laura Van Gilder (USA)	+ 2:57
20	Pauline Ferrand-Prévot (FRA)	+ 2:58
21	Natasha Elliott (CAN)	+ 2:58
22	Mika Ogishima (JPN)	+ 3:29
23	Sabrina Schweizer (GER)	+ 3:38
24	Gabriella Day (GBR)	+ 3:39
25	Veronica Alessio (ITA)	+ 4:04
26	Ayako Toyooka (JPN)	+ 4:05
27	Daniela Bresciani (ITA)	+ 4:06
28	Milena Cavani (ITA)	+ 4:06
29	Elke Riedl (AUT)	+ 5:10
30	Francesca Cucciniello (ITA)	+ 5:11
31	Pepper Harlton (CAN)	+ 5:24
32	Jana Kyptova (CZE)	+ 5:43
33	Nadia Triquet-Claude (FRA)	+ 6:09
34	Lise Müller (SUI)	+ 6:20
35	Katrin Leumann (SUI)	+ 7:25
