= 2013 UCI Cyclo-cross World Championships – Women's elite race =

Women's Elite Cyclo-cross Race
2013 UCI Cyclo-cross World Championships
- Rainbow jersey

Race details
- Dates: February 2, 2013
- Stages: 1
- Distance: 16.8 km (10.44 mi)
- Winning time: 43' 00"

Medalists
| | Gold | Marianne Vos (Netherlands) |
| | Silver | Katie Compton (United States) |
| | Bronze | Lucie Chainel-Lefèvre (France) |

This event was held on February 2, 2013, as a part of the 2013 UCI Cyclo-cross World Championships in Louisville, Kentucky, United States. Marianne Vos dominated the race and took home her sixth cyclo-cross world title.

== Ranking ==
| Rank | Cyclist | Time |
|---|---|---|
| Gold medal | Marianne Vos (NED) | 43' 00" |
| Silver medal | Katie Compton (USA) | + 1' 34" |
| Bronze medal | Lucie Chainel-Lefèvre (FRA) | + 2' 10" |
| 4 | Kateřina Nash (CZE) | + 2' 12" |
| 5 | Sanne van Paassen (NED) | + 2' 15" |
| 6 | Eva Lechner (ITA) | + 2' 17" |
| 7 | Jasmin Achermann (SUI) | + 2' 36" |
| 8 | Sabrina Stultiens (NED) | + 3' 06" |
| 9 | Ellen Van Loy (BEL) | + 3' 18" |
| 10 | Kaitlin Antonneau (USA) | + 3' 19" |
| 11 | Amy Dombroski (USA) | + 3' 26" |
| 12 | Annie Last (GBR) | + 3' 36" |
| 13 | Helen Wyman (GBR) | + 4' 02" |
| 14 | Alice Maria Arzuffi (ITA) | + 4' 09" |
| 15 | Jade Wilcoxson (USA) | + 4' 14" |
| 16 | Emily Batty (CAN) | + 4' 17" |
| 17 | Georgia Gould (USA) | + 4' 24" |
| 18 | Sanne Cant (BEL) | + 4' 26" |
| 19 | Mical Dyck (CAN) | + 4' 39" |
| 20 | Pavla Havliková (CZE) | + 4' 46" |
| 21 | Christel Ferrier-Bruneau (FRA) | + 4' 48" |
| 22 | Wendy Simms (CAN) | + 4' 56" |
| 23 | Francesca Cauz (ITA) | + 5' 07" |
| 24 | Pepper Harlton (CAN) | + 5' 22" |
| 25 | Gabriella Day (GBR) | + 6' 36" |
| 26 | Ayako Toyooka (JPN) | 1 LAP |
| 27 | Julie Lafrenière (CAN) | 1 LAP |
| 28 | Genevieve Whitson (NZL) | 1 LAP |
| 29 | Martina Mikulášková (CZE) | 1 LAP |
| 30 | Chika Fukumoto (JPN) | 2 LAPS |
| | Meredith Miller (USA) | DNF |
| | Madara Fūrmane (LAT) | DNS |
