= Connor Swift =

British cyclist

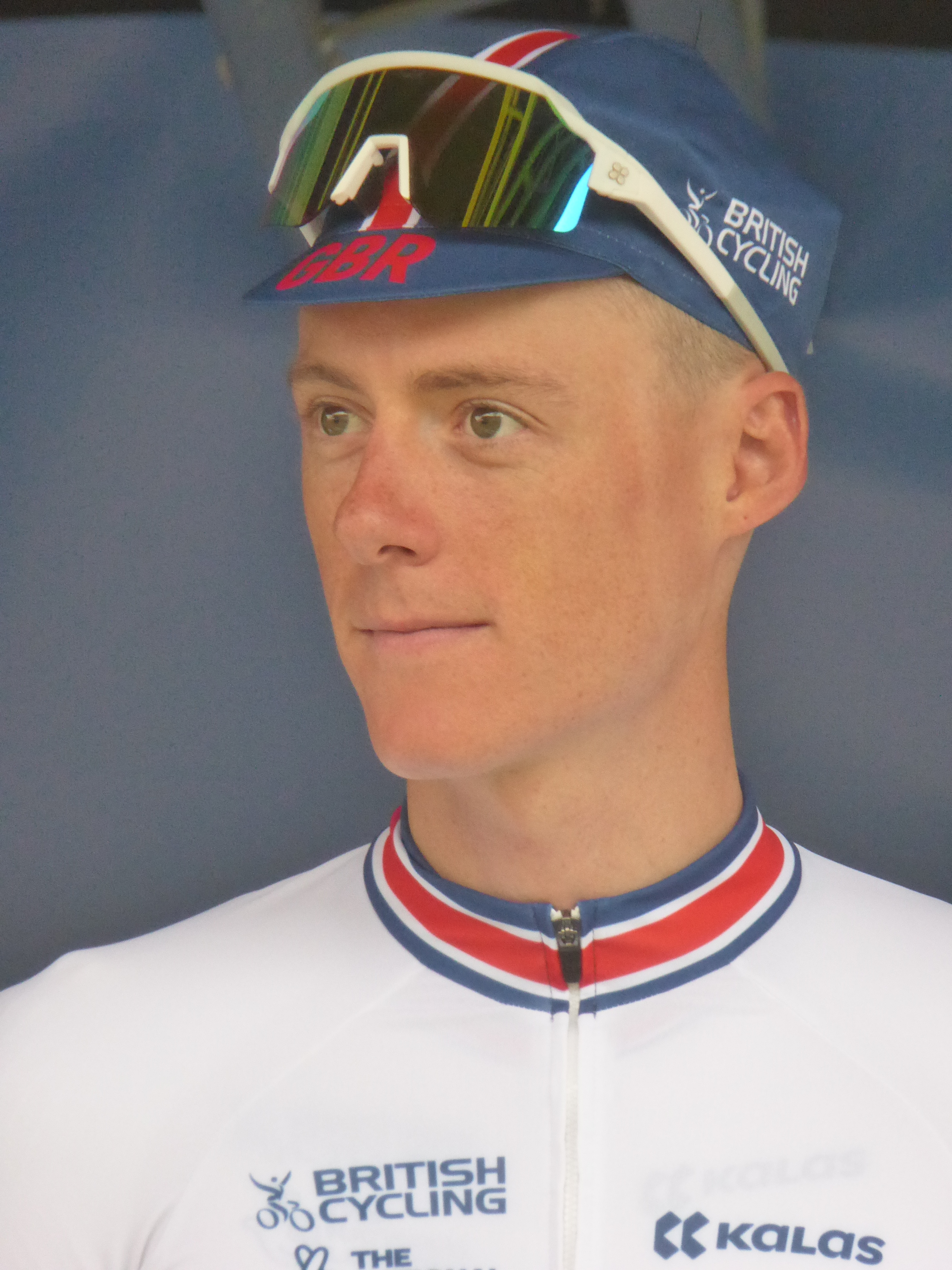
- Swift at the 2023 UCI Road World Championships

Personal information
- Full name: Connor Swift
- Born: 30 October 1995 (age 30) Bath, Somerset, United Kingdom
- Height: 1.90 m (6 ft 3 in)
- Weight: 75 kg (165 lb)

Cycling career
- Sport: Cycling
- Current team: Netcompany–Ineos
- Disciplines: Road; Gravel
- Role: Rider
- Rider type: Rouleur

Amateur teams
- 2015: Polypipe
- 2016: Envelopemaster Giant Sheffield
- 2018: Team Dimension Data (stagiaire)

Professional teams
- 2017–2019: Madison Genesis
- 2019–2022: Arkéa–Samsic
- 2023–: INEOS Grenadiers

Major wins
- One-day races and Classics National Road Race Championships (2018) Tro-Bro Léon (2021)
Medal record
Representing United Kingdom
Men's gravel cycling
World Championships
| Bronze medal – third place | 2023 Veneto | Elite |

Connor Swift (born 30 October 1995) is an English racing cyclist, who rides for UCI WorldTeam Netcompany–Ineos.

Since turning professional, Swift has taken three wins in road racing – the 2018 British National Road Race Championships, the 2021 Tro-Bro Léon and the 2021 Tour Poitou-Charentes en Nouvelle-Aquitaine. In gravel racing, Swift has won a bronze medal at the 2023 UCI Gravel World Championships in Italy as well as in 2026, and won the British National Championships in 2024.

== Career ==
=== Amateur teams and Madison Genesis (2015–2019) ===
Born in Bath, Somerset, Swift rode for the Polypipe and Envelopemaster Giant Sheffield amateur teams before joining UCI Continental team Madison Genesis for the 2017 season. In his first year with the team, Swift won two rounds of the Tour Series criterium competition – held in Bath and Stevenage respectively – and he also placed seventh in the Velothon Wales one-day race. In the early part of 2018, Swift finished second to Matteo Moschetti on the final stage of the Tour de Normandie, and finished fourth in the Rutland–Melton CiCLE Classic, having suffered a late puncture. He ultimately took his first professional victory later in the season, as he won the British National Road Race Championships in Stamfordham, soloing away from a lead group with 12 kilometres (7.5 miles) remaining to become the first UCI Continental rider to win the title since Kristian House in 2009.

Having taken a second-place overall finish at the Kreiz Breizh Elites in July – and finishing in the same time as overall winner Damien Touzé – Swift was announced as a stagiaire by Team Dimension Data, riding for the team at all his remaining starts in 2018, with the exception of the Tour of Britain. He remained with Madison Genesis into the first part of the 2019 season, where he recorded top-ten overall finishes at both the Tour de Normandie and the Tour de Yorkshire, before winning the opening round of the Tour Series in Redditch.

=== Arkéa–Samsic (2019–2022) ===
Following his early season performances in 2019, Swift made a mid-season move to UCI Professional Continental team Arkéa–Samsic, with a role as a domestique for the squad's main sprinter, André Greipel. He made his first start with the team at the Four Days of Dunkirk, and just missed a top-ten overall placing at the Tour of Belgium, in eleventh position. The following year, Swift made his Grand Tour début at the Tour de France, finishing inside the top 20 places on the opening stage of the race.

Swift took his first victory with the team at the 2021 Tro-Bro Léon, winning a group sprint of five riders in Lannilis, to become the first British rider to win the race. He then followed this up with top-ten results at both Dwars door het Hageland (sixth) and the Tour of Belgium (seventh). He rode the Tour de France for the second successive year, featuring as part of the breakaway on the opening stage of the race in Brittany. Later in the season, he won his first stage race at the Tour Poitou-Charentes en Nouvelle-Aquitaine; he took the overall lead following the stage four individual time trial, and maintained this through the final stage the following day. He also recorded a top-five finish in the Bretagne Classic Ouest-France, finishing as part of the first chase group. In 2022, he recorded top-ten finishes in early-season races in France and Spain, finishing seventh overall at Étoile de Bessèges, and fifth at the Clásica Jaén Paraíso Interior. Later in the season, he was unable to defend his previous victories from 2021, finishing third at Tro-Bro Léon – won by teammate Hugo Hofstetter – and fifth overall at the Tour Poitou-Charentes en Nouvelle-Aquitaine.

=== Ineos Grenadiers (2023–present) ===
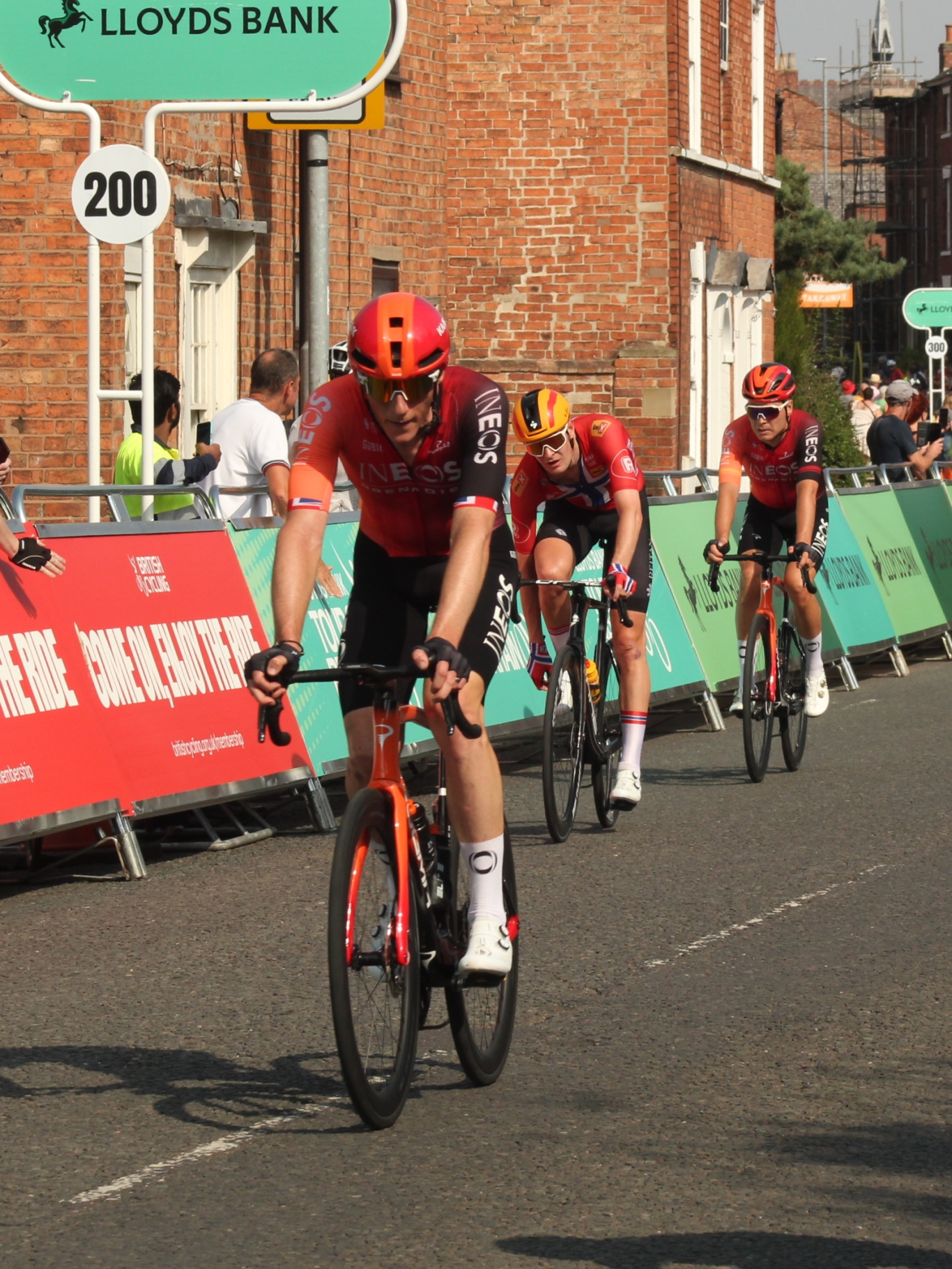
Swift (front) at the 2024 Tour of Britain

Swift signed an initial two-year contract to join the INEOS Grenadiers for the 2023 season. His best results on the roads were a third-place finish at the British National Time Trial Championships, and a fourth-place finish in the general classification at the Tour de Wallonie. He did, however, win a round of the UCI Gravel World Series, when he won The Gralloch event in Gatehouse of Fleet. He followed this up with a second-place finish to Joseph Blackmore at the British National Gravel Championships, before finishing third at the UCI Gravel World Championships in Italy. Having extended his contract for a further two years in summer 2024, Swift improved on his National Gravel Championships result from the previous year, winning the race by around three minutes. He won the Graean Cymru UCI Gravel World Series race in Llyn Brenig – ahead of cousin Ben Swift – before the UCI Gravel World Championships in Belgium, where he would ultimately finish in sixth position.

== Personal life ==
Swift grew up in Doncaster, South Yorkshire, and attended Trinity Academy, Thorne. His cousin, Ben Swift, is also a professional cyclist.

== Major results ==
=== Gravel ===
2023
UCI World Series

1st Gatehouse of Fleet

2nd National Championships
3rd UCI World Championships
2024
1st National Championships
UCI World Series

1st Llyn Brenig

6th UCI World Championships
2025
1st National Championships
6th UEC European Championships

=== Mountain bike ===
2021
3rd Marathon, National Championships

=== Road ===
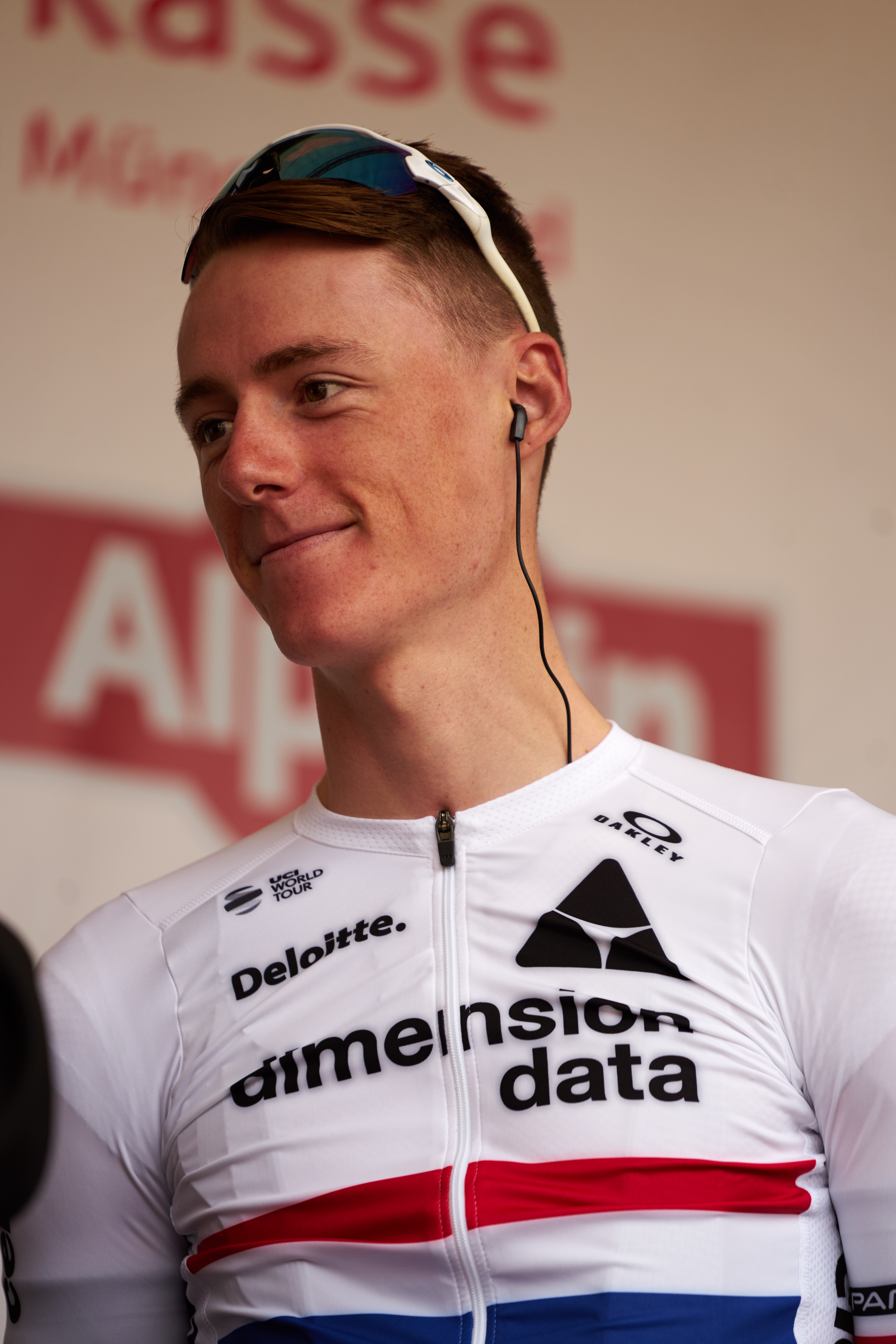
Swift, wearing the British national road race champion's jersey, at the 2018 Münsterland Giro

2017
Tour Series

1st Bath
1st Stevenage

7th Velothon Wales
2018 (1 pro win)
1st Road race, National Championships
2nd Overall Kreiz Breizh Elites
4th Rutland–Melton CiCLE Classic
5th Overall Tour of the Reservoir
5th Polynormande
2019
1st Redditch, Tour Series
9th Overall Tour de Yorkshire
9th Overall Tour de Normandie
2021 (2)
1st Overall Tour Poitou-Charentes en Nouvelle-Aquitaine
1st Tro-Bro Léon
5th Bretagne Classic
6th Dwars door het Hageland
7th Overall Tour of Belgium
2022
3rd Tro-Bro Léon
5th Overall Tour Poitou-Charentes en Nouvelle-Aquitaine
5th Clásica Jaén Paraíso Interior
7th Overall Étoile de Bessèges
2023
3rd Time trial, National Championships
4th Overall Tour de Wallonie
2024
National Championships

4th Road race
5th Time trial

2026
National Championships

2nd Time trial
3rd Road race

==== Grand Tour general classification results timeline ====
| Grand Tour | 2020 | 2021 | 2022 | 2023 | 2024 | 2025 | 2026 |
|---|---|---|---|---|---|---|---|
| Giro d'Italia | — | — | — | — | 83 | — | 77 |
| Tour de France | 106 | 89 | 70 | — | — | 109 | |
| Vuelta a España | Has not contested during his career | | | | | | |

Legend
| — | Did not compete |
| DNF | Did not finish |
| IP | In progress |
