= Wendy Simms =

Wendy Simms may refer to:

- Wendy Simms (CSI: Crime Scene Investigation), character from CSI: Crime Scene Investigation
- Wendy Simms (cyclist), Canadian professional racing cyclist
