= 2026 UCI Gravel World Championships =

Gravel cycling championships

- Venue: Nannup, Western Australia
- Date: 10–11 October 2026

The 2026 UCI Gravel World Championships will be held 10 and 11 October 2026 in Nannup, Western Australia. It will be the fifth edition of the championships. The course is based on the SEVEN gravel race, first held in 2018, which has been featured in every edition of the UCI Gravel World Series.

== Course ==
Riders competing in elite men at the start line. Winner Magnus Bak Klaris is visible in the front row, third from the left.

The course is 123.1 kilometres (76.5 mi) for the women's race and 140.7 kilometres (87.4 mi) for the men's race, starting and ending in the town of Nannup. Over 80% of the course is on gravel, with short sections of asphalt throughout. Both courses have over 3,000 metres (9,800 ft) of elevation gain and many short, steep climbs, with the race organizers comparing the race style to Liège-Bastogne-Liège, a classic cycle race in Belgium known to favor puncheurs.

== Medal summary ==
Event	Gold		Silver		Bronze	
Men's events
Men elite	Magnus Bak Klaris (DEN)	4h 09' 05"	Florian Vermeersch (BEL)	s.t.	Connor Swift (GBR)	s.t.
Women's events
Women elite	Marianne Vos (NED)	4h 30' 04"	Rosa Maria Klöser (GER)	+27"	Larissa Hartog (NED)	+2' 15"
