= Sabrina Stultiens =

Dutch cyclist

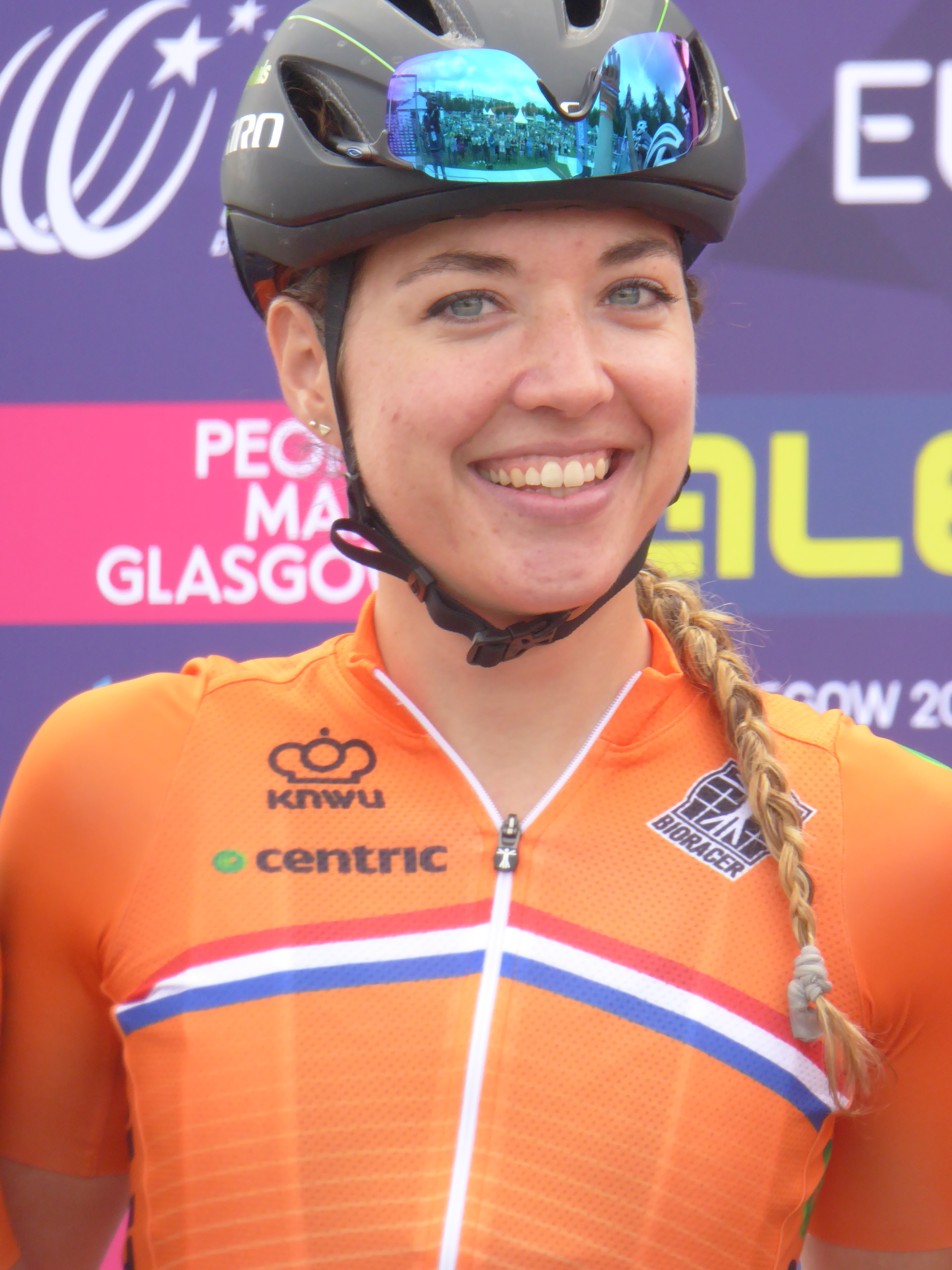
- Stultiens at the 2018 European Road Cycling Championships.

Personal information
- Born: 8 July 1993 (age 33) Helmond, Netherlands

Cycling career
- Sport: Cycling
- Current team: VolkerWessels Women Cyclingteam
- Disciplines: Road; Cyclo-cross
- Role: Rider

Amateur team
- 2010–2011: Brainwash

Professional teams
- 2012–2015: Rabobank-Liv Woman Cycling Team
- 2015–2017: Team Liv–Plantur
- 2018–2023: Liv Racing TeqFind
- 2024–: VolkerWessels Women Cyclingteam

Major wins
- UEC European Under-23 Road Race Championships (2014); UCI World Team Time Trial Championships (2017)

Sabrina Stultiens (born 8 July 1993) is a Dutch road and cyclo-cross racing cyclist, who currently rides for UCI Women's Continental Team VolkerWessels Women Cyclingteam.

Stultiens won the women's under-23 road race at the 2014 European Road Championships. This qualified her to compete in the women's road race at the 2014 Road World Championships, in which she finished in 56th place out of 134 entrants. In cyclo-cross, Stultiens finished eighth in the 2013 World Championships.

== Major results ==
=== Cyclo-cross ===
2011–2012
3rd Cyclo-cross Zonhoven, Superprestige
7th Women's race, UEC European Cyclo-cross Championships
2012–2013
2nd Sluitingsprijs Oostmalle, bpost bank trophy
2nd Caubergcross
3rd Women's race, National Cyclo-cross Championships
3rd Overall Superprestige

3rd Cyclo-cross Zonhoven
3rd Vlaamse Aardbeiencross

8th Women's race, UCI Cyclo-cross World Championships
2013–2014
3rd Women's race, National Cyclo-cross Championships
3rd Superprestige Gieten, Superprestige
3rd Jaarmarktcross Niel
2014–2015
1st Zilvermeercross
1st Cyclocross Leuven
3rd Women's race, National Cyclo-cross Championships
6th Overall UCI Cyclo-cross World Cup

2nd Duinencross Koksijde

2015–2016
2nd Women's race, National Cyclo-cross Championships
2nd Zilvermeercross
6th Women's race, UCI Cyclo-cross World Championships

=== Road ===
2013
1st Young rider classification Emakumeen Euskal Bira
9th Holland Hills Classic
2014
1st Road race, UEC European Under-23 Road Championships
6th Holland Hills Classic
7th Giro del Trentino Alto Adige-Südtirol
8th Overall La Route de France

1st Young rider classification

2015
2nd Overall Auensteiner–Radsporttage

1st Young rider classification

2nd 94.7 Cycle Challenge
4th Holland Hills Classic
6th Time trial, UEC European Under-23 Road Championships
2017
1st Team time trial, UCI Road World Championships
2018
1st Stage 1 Emakumeen Euskal Bira
3rd Durango-Durango Emakumeen Saria
6th Liège–Bastogne–Liège
7th La Flèche Wallonne Féminine
10th Overall The Women's Tour
2020
5th Giro dell'Emilia Internazionale Donne Elite
2021
4th Donostia San Sebastián Klasikoa
10th Durango-Durango Emakumeen Saria
