= 2022 Tro-Bro Léon =

2022 UCI ProSeries

Race details
- Dates: 15 May 2022
- Stages: 1
- Distance: 207.8 km (129.1 mi)
- Winning time: 5h 07' 15"

Results
	Winner	Hugo Hofstetter (FRA)	(Arkéa–Samsic)
	Second	Luca Mozzato (ITA)	(B&B Hotels–KTM)
	Third	Connor Swift (GBR)	(Arkéa–Samsic)

The 2022 Tro-Bro Léon was the 38th edition of Tro-Bro Léon, a one-day road cycling race in the northwestern French region of Brittany, that took place on 15 May 2022.

== Teams ==
Six of the eighteen UCI WorldTeams, ten UCI ProTeams, and six UCI Continental teams made up the 22 teams that participated in the race.

UCI WorldTeams

- AG2R Citroën Team
- Cofidis
- Groupama–FDJ
- Intermarché–Wanty–Gobert Matériaux
- Lotto–Soudal
- UAE Team Emirates

UCI ProTeams

- Arkéa–Samsic
- B&B Hotels–KTM
- Bingoal Pauwels Sauces WB
- Burgos BH
- Caja Rural–Seguros RGA
- Equipo Kern Pharma
- Euskaltel–Euskadi
- Human Powered Health
- Team TotalEnergies
- Uno-X Pro Cycling Team

UCI Continental Teams

- St. Michel–Auber93
- Bike Aid
- Go Sport–Roubaix–Lille Métropole
- Nice Métropole Côte d'Azur
- Premier Tech U-23 Cycling Project
- Team UC Nantes Atlantique

== Result ==
Result
Rank	Rider	Team	Time
1	Hugo Hofstetter (FRA)	Arkéa–Samsic	5h 07' 15"
2	Luca Mozzato (ITA)	B&B Hotels–KTM	+ 0"
3	Connor Swift (GBR)	Arkéa–Samsic	+ 9"
4	Arnaud De Lie (BEL)	Lotto–Soudal	+ 30"
5	Samuel Watson (GBR)	Groupama–FDJ	+ 30"
6	Matis Louvel (FRA)	Arkéa–Samsic	+ 30"
7	Laurent Pichon (FRA)	Arkéa–Samsic	+ 30"
8	Morné van Niekerk (RSA)	St. Michel–Auber93	+ 30"
9	Stan Dewulf (BEL)	AG2R Citroën Team	+ 30"
10	Matthieu Ladagnous (FRA)	Groupama–FDJ	+ 33"
