= Marianne Vos =

Dutch cyclist (born 1987)

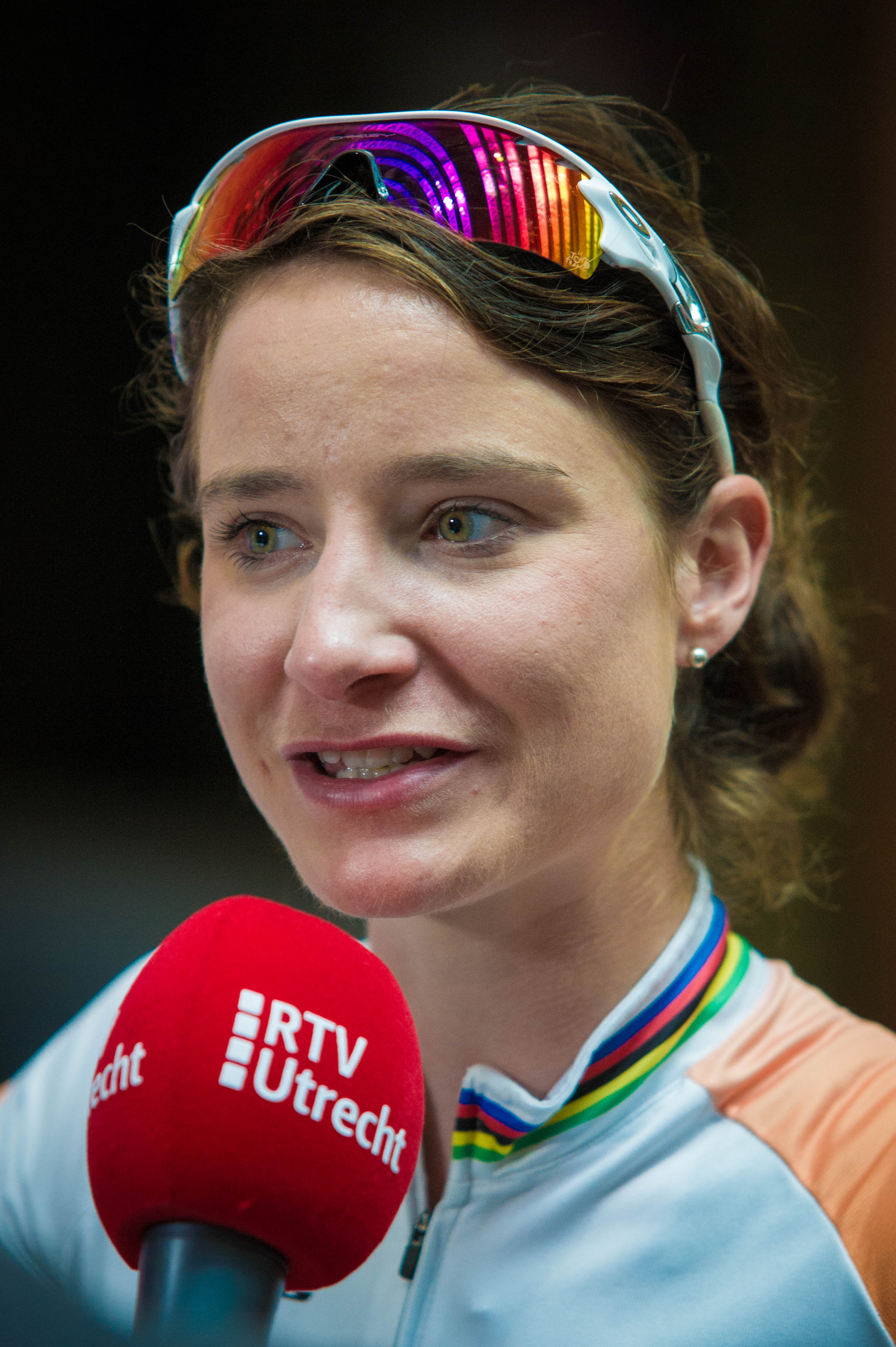
- Vos in 2015

Personal information
- Nicknames: The Cannibal; The G.O.A.T.
- Born: 13 May 1987 (age 39) 's-Hertogenbosch, Netherlands
- Height: 1.68 m (5 ft 6 in)
- Weight: 58 kg (128 lb)

Cycling career
- Sport: Cycling
- Current team: Visma–Lease a Bike
- Disciplines: Road; Cyclo-cross; Mountain biking Track
- Role: Rider
- Rider type: All-rounder

Professional teams
- 2006–2020: CCC - Liv
- 2021–: Team Jumbo–Visma

Major wins
- Cyclo-cross World Championships (2006, 2009–2014, 2022) European Championships (2005, 2009) National Championships (2011–2015, 2017, 2022) World Cup (2018–19) 27 individual wins (2006–07, 2008–09—2016–17, 2018–19, 2021–22) Gravel World Championships (2024, 2026) Road Major Tours Tour de France Points classification (2022, 2024) 3 individual stages (2022, 2025) Giro d'Italia General classification (2011, 2012, 2014) Points classification (2007, 2010–2014, 2020) Mountains classification (2011) Young rider classification (2010) 32 individual stages La Vuelta Femenina Points classification (2023, 2024, 2025) 6 individual stages (2023, 2024, 2025) 1 TTT stage (2023) Stage races Emakumeen Bira (2008, 2011) Holland Ladies Tour (2009–2012) The Women's Tour (2014) Grand Prix Elsy Jacobs (2012, 2013) Ladies Tour of Norway (2017, 2018, 2019) Volta a Catalunya (2024) One-day races and Classics Olympic Games Road Race (2012) World Road Race Championships (2006, 2012, 2013) European Road Race Championships (2006, 2007, 2017) National Road Race Championships (2006, 2008, 2009, 2011) National Time Trial Championships (2010, 2011) Tour of Flanders (2013) Trofeo Alfredo Binda (2009, 2010, 2012, 2019) Ronde van Drenthe (2011, 2012, 2013) Gent–Wevelgem (2021) Dwars door Vlaanderen (2024) Amstel Gold Race (2021, 2024) La Flèche Wallonne (2007, 2008, 2009, 2011, 2013) La Course by Le Tour de France (2014, 2019) GP de Plouay (2012, 2013) Gooik–Geraardsbergen–Gooik (2011, 2014, 2017) Open de Suède Vårgårda (2009, 2013, 2018) GP Ciudad de Valladolid (2011) Grand Prix Elsy Jacobs (2011) Rund um die Nürnberger Altstadt (2007) Sparkassen Giro Bochum (2014)
Medal record
Representing the Netherlands
Women's Cyclo-cross
World Championships
Gold medal – first place	2006 Zeddam	Elite
Gold medal – first place	2009 Hoogerheide	Elite
Gold medal – first place	2010 Tábor	Elite
Gold medal – first place	2011 Sankt Wendel	Elite
Gold medal – first place	2012 Koksijde	Elite
Gold medal – first place	2013 Louisville	Elite
Gold medal – first place	2014 Hoogerheide	Elite
Gold medal – first place	2022 Fayetteville	Elite
Silver medal – second place	2008 Treviso	Elite
Silver medal – second place	2017 Bieles	Elite
Bronze medal – third place	2015 Tábor	Elite
Bronze medal – third place	2019 Bogense	Elite
European Championships
Gold medal – first place	2005 Pontchâteau	Elite
Gold medal – first place	2009 Hoogstraten	Elite
Silver medal – second place	2003 Tábor	Elite
Silver medal – second place	2018 Rosmalen	Elite
Bronze medal – third place	2006 Huijbergen	Elite
Women's Road bicycle racing
Olympic Games
Gold medal – first place	2012 London	Road race
Silver medal – second place	2024 Paris	Road race
World Championships
Gold medal – first place	2006 Salzburg	Road race
Gold medal – first place	2012 Valkenburg	Road race
Gold medal – first place	2013 Tuscany	Road race
Silver medal – second place	2007 Stuttgart	Road race
Silver medal – second place	2008 Varese	Road race
Silver medal – second place	2009 Mendrisio	Road race
Silver medal – second place	2010 Geelong	Road race
Silver medal – second place	2011 Copenhagen	Road race
Silver medal – second place	2013 Florence	Team Time Trial
Silver medal – second place	2021 Flanders	Road race
European Games
Silver medal – second place	2019 Minsk	Road race
European Championships
Gold medal – first place	2006 Valkenburg	Road race
Gold medal – first place	2007 Sofia	Road race
Gold medal – first place	2017 Herning	Road race
Silver medal – second place	2018 Glasgow	Road race
Bronze medal – third place	2009 Hooglede-Gits	Road race
Bronze medal – third place	2009 Hooglede-Gits	Time Trial
Women's Track cycling
Olympic Games
Gold medal – first place	2008 Beijing	Points race
World Championships
Gold medal – first place	2008 Manchester	Points race
Gold medal – first place	2011 Apeldoorn	Scratch
Women's gravel bicycle racing
World Championships
Gold medal – first place	2024 Flemish Brabant	Elite
Gold medal – first place	2026 Nanoop	Elite

Marianne Vos (born 13 May 1987) is a Dutch multi-discipline cyclist who currently rides for UCI Women's WorldTeam Visma–Lease a Bike under a lifetime contract. She has won 15 World Championships across four separate cycling disciplines – cyclo-cross, gravel, road and track.

After winning a junior European and World Championship in road racing, she continued her success in senior cycling by becoming World Champion in cyclo-cross and road racing at the age of 19. Vos added track racing World Championships when she won the points race in 2008 and the scratch race in 2011. At the 2008 Summer Olympics, she won the gold medal in the points race; at the 2012 Summer Olympics, gold in the women's road race.

On the road, Vos has won the World Road Race Championship 3 times (2006, 2012 and 2013). She has multiple wins at major road cycling events including the Giro d'Italia Women, La Flèche Wallonne, Amstel Gold Race and Trofeo Alfredo Binda-Comune di Cittiglio; also she ranked first in points in the UCI Women's Road World Cup five times and in the 2019 UCI Women's World Tour. Vos has also won the points classification at all three of the largest women's stage races – the Giro d'Italia Women, Tour de France Femmes and La Vuelta Femenina. Vos also won the Dutch National Road Race Championships 4 times and the Dutch National Time Trial Championships twice.

In cyclo-cross, Vos has won the World Cyclo-cross Championship 8 times (2006, 2009, 2010, 2011, 2012, 2013, 2014 and 2022), and the Dutch National Cyclo-cross Championships 7 times. In the UCI Cyclo-cross World Cup, she has won 27 races, and claimed first place overall in the 2018–19 season. In gravel racing, Vos has won the World Gravel Championship twice (2024 and 2026).

Vos was a founding member of Le Tour Entier, which campaigned for a Women's Tour de France and improvements to women's cycling generally. Vos has drawn comparison to Eddy Merckx as being "the finest cyclist of [her] generation".

== Early years ==
Marianne Vos was born in 's-Hertogenbosch, North Brabant and lives in the small village of Babyloniënbroek. She started cycling when she was six years old after watching her older brother who was already a cyclist. At first she trained with her brother's team as she was not allowed to participate in races; during the winter she started training in cyclo-cross as well. When she was eight, she was able to ride races. Vos also participated in speed skating and inline speed skating. At 14 she replaced inline skating with mountain biking.

== Professional career ==
=== 2000s ===
In 2002, she won two national championships and finished second in another. She became Dutch mountain biking champion and won the national junior road race, while she finished second in the Dutch time trial championship behind Roxane Knetemann. In 2003 Vos successfully defended her national junior mountain bike title. At the time trial championships she again finished second, this time behind Maxime Groenewegen while 2002 champion Roxane Knetemann finished fourth.

In 2004, Vos excelled in cyclo-cross for the first time when she won her first international race in Gieten, beating Birgit Hollmann and Arenda Grimberg. She finished third in the Dutch junior road race and time trial, unable to beat Ellen van Dijk who won both events. Continuing her cyclo-cross season she added wins in Surhuisterveen and Pijnacker–Nootdorp. In the last she beat Hanka Kupfernagel and Daphny van den Brand. For the third straight time she became Dutch junior champion in mountain biking before heading to Verona for the junior road world championship. Aged 17 and a first-year junior, Vos broke away in the final of five laps on the climb. She stayed clear and became world champion. At the end of 2004 Vos was elected Sport FM Sportswoman of the year 2004.

In 2005, junior world champion Vos claimed her first Dutch junior national road title in front of 2004 champion Ellen van Dijk. Van Dijk was able to defend her time trial title successfully before Maxime Groenewegen, while Vos finished third again. Participating as a senior at the Dutch cyclo-cross championship Vos finished second behind Daphny van den Brand. She then won her fourth Dutch junior mountain bike title, before winning a junior World Cup meeting in Houffalize. She finished fourth at the world junior cyclo-cross championship and won a race held in Heeswijk a week later. From then on Vos occasionally took part in senior road races. One was the Omloop van Borsele which she won by beating Adrie Visser. Including Vos's world championship in 2004 the Netherlands had won the last three editions of the junior championship (the others being Loes Markerink in 2002 and Suzanne de Goede in 2003). Vos's goal was to add a fourth title by defending her title in Salzburg, but she finished second behind Denmark's Mie Bekker Lacota. Vos competed in cyclo-cross again. Six weeks after her silver medal in Salzburg she won in Harderwijk and Suameer. Her next aim was the European cyclo-cross championship in Pontchâteau, France. She started in the elite field and was expected to assist Daphny van den Brand but instead beat the favourites, including van den Brand who won silver. After the European championship she won two cyclo-crosses in Gieten and Loenhout. Vos was named Sport FM Sportswoman of the year 2005.

In 2006, Vos won her first race on 1 January in Pétange. Less than a week later, the Dutch championship in Huijbergen was again a clash between Vos and van den Brand, this time van den Brand became champion while Vos took silver. Vos then concentrated on the world cyclo-cross championship in her own country, in Zeddam. On 29 January 2006 she was in excellent form, with only Hanka Kupfernagel and Daphny van den Brand able to catch her. Van den Brand changed bikes and lost her lead, finishing one minute behind to take bronze. The gold medal was decided in the last metres when Vos outsprinted Kupfernagel. During the 2006 road season Vos took part in the Gracia–Orlová Tour in the Czech Republic and won the 5th stage, 2:20 ahead of the pack. In that same week she won the Omloop van Borsele for the second time in a row, beating Vera Koedooder and Bertine Spijkerman. In Spain she took part in the Emakumeen Bira and won the 1st stage. She then travelled back to the Netherlands for the national road championship in Maastricht. Vos cycled in a group containing all the favourites for the race and outsprinted Sharon van Essen and Suzanne de Goede to win the title. On 28 June 2006 Vos was named Dutch Sports Talent of the year 2006 ahead of pentathlete Laurien Hoos and gymnast Epke Zonderland. The additional award was handed to her by former swimming star Erica Terpstra.

A few weeks later she was strongest in the Omloop van Valkenburg where she again finished in front of de Goede. Vos was still in the junior age category and took part in the European road race championship in Valkenburg. She won the sprint against Italy's Tatiana Guderzo. She went on to win two stages and overall in the Tour Féminin en Limousin. In July, she won criteriums in Steenwijk, Draai van de Kaai, Oostvoorne and Pijnackerow. In August 2006, she signed a five-year deal with the Dutch team Team DSB - Ballast Nedam. It wasn't long before she won her first race with DSB. At the end of the 4th stage of the Trophée d'Or Féminin Vos beat Tanja Schmidt-Hennes.

With the silver medal won in 2005 in mind, Vos returned to Salzburg for the senior road race at the world road race championship. Vos remained in the bunch until Nicole Cooke started the action in the fifth of six laps. Cooke attacked on the second climb and only Nicole Brändli and Vos were able to catch her. A few others came back a few kilometres later. Judith Arndt left the group by herself. Vos made the jump to Arndt and they led for a few minutes until the chasers came back. From then, the group stayed together apart from attacks on either the flat road or the second climb. The race went to a sprint of 15 riders, with Vos taking another rainbow jersey. In the European cyclo-cross championship Vos won a bronze medal behind Daphny van den Brand and Hanka Kupfernagel.

In 2007, Vos won La Flèche Wallonne Féminine and the Rund um die Nürnberger Altstadt World Cup events before going on to win the series overall. She also finished second in the road race world championships, conceding her title to Marta Bastianelli of Italy who broke away in the last 15 km of the race.

In 2008, Vos added a track cycling world title to her list when she won the women's points race at the track cycling world championships. In doing so, she became the first woman to have held world championship titles on the road, track and cyclo-cross. Vos became Olympic points race champion at the 2008 Summer Olympics in Beijing.

In 2009, Vos started by winning the cyclo-cross world championships. She also had success on the road, as she won La Flèche Wallonne Féminine for the third time. Later that year, she finished second in the road world championships.

=== 2010s ===
In 2010, Vos became cyclo-cross world champion again and won the silver medal in the road world championships for the fourth time in a row.

In 2011, Vos won the Giro d'Italia Femminile, winning 5 stages in the process as well as the points and mountains classifications. Later that year, she captured her fifth consecutive silver medal at the road world championships. She won the scratch race in the track world championships, and the world cyclo-cross championship. Vos was appointed as a member of the inaugural UCI Athletes' Commission in 2011.

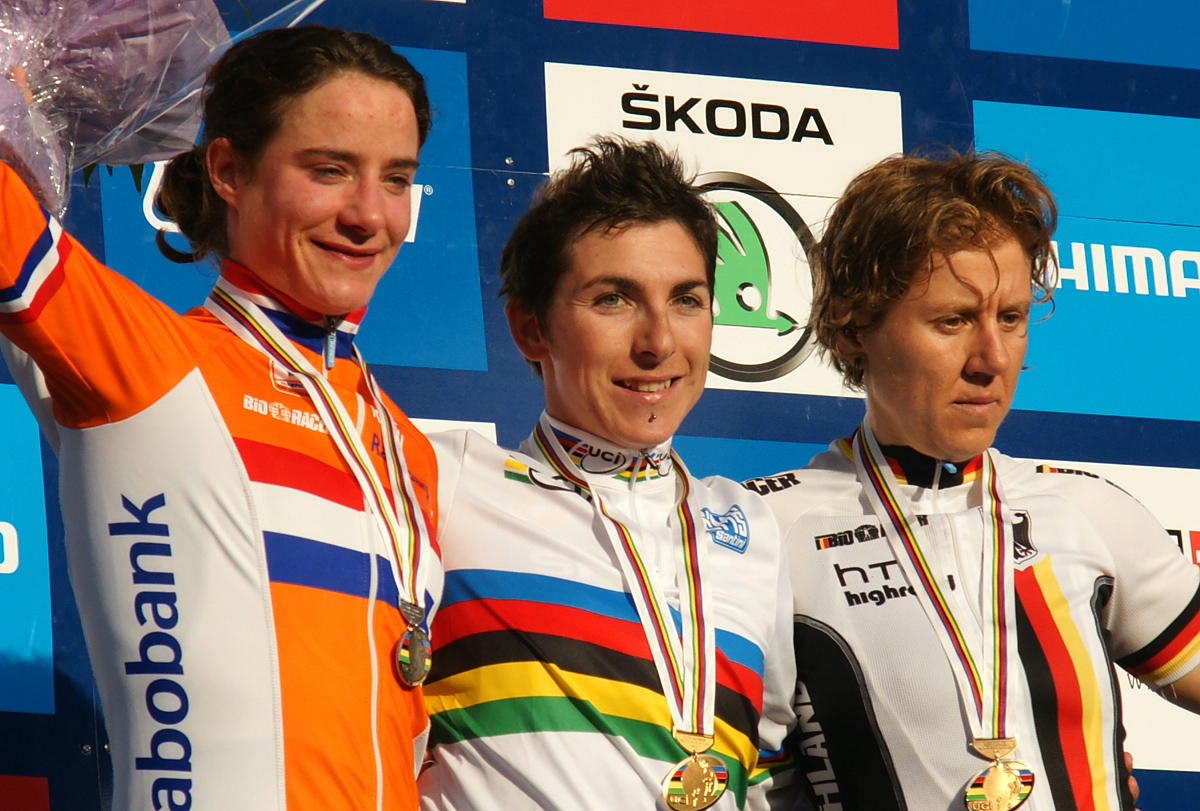
Podium of the women's road race at the 2011 UCI Road World Championships; Giorgia Bronzini (1), Marianne Vos (2) and Ina-Yoko Teutenberg (3)

In 2012, Vos won the world cyclo-cross championship again. On the road, she recorded wins at the Ronde van Drenthe and the Trofeo Alfredo Binda, but fractured her collarbone after colliding with a motorcycle during the Valkenburg Hills Classic on 25 May. Although she was still able to finish the race in second place and did not require surgery, she did not resume racing until the Dutch national championships on 23 June in which she finished second, 3 seconds behind Annemiek van Vleuten. She then raced in the Giro Donne, where for the second year running she won five stages and the general classification. On 29 July she won gold in the London Olympic Games road race winning the sprint from a 3-woman breakaway which formed following the final lap of the Box Hill, Surrey circuit on the return to London. She finished 16th in the time trial. In September, Vos won her second road race world title in Valkenburg, Netherlands after five second places in a row (2007–2011).

In 2013, Vos started off her year with yet another dominant performance at the 2013 cyclo-cross world championships, winning her fifth world championship in a row, and her sixth overall. Vos took little time off after her unprecedented fifth consecutive title, winning mountain bike races and then taking her first win at the Tour of Flanders by outsprinting Ellen van Dijk. On 28 September Vos won another world road race championship after riding away from her challengers on a steep climb in the final lap of the course in Florence, Italy. She finished 15 seconds ahead of the second and third placed riders.

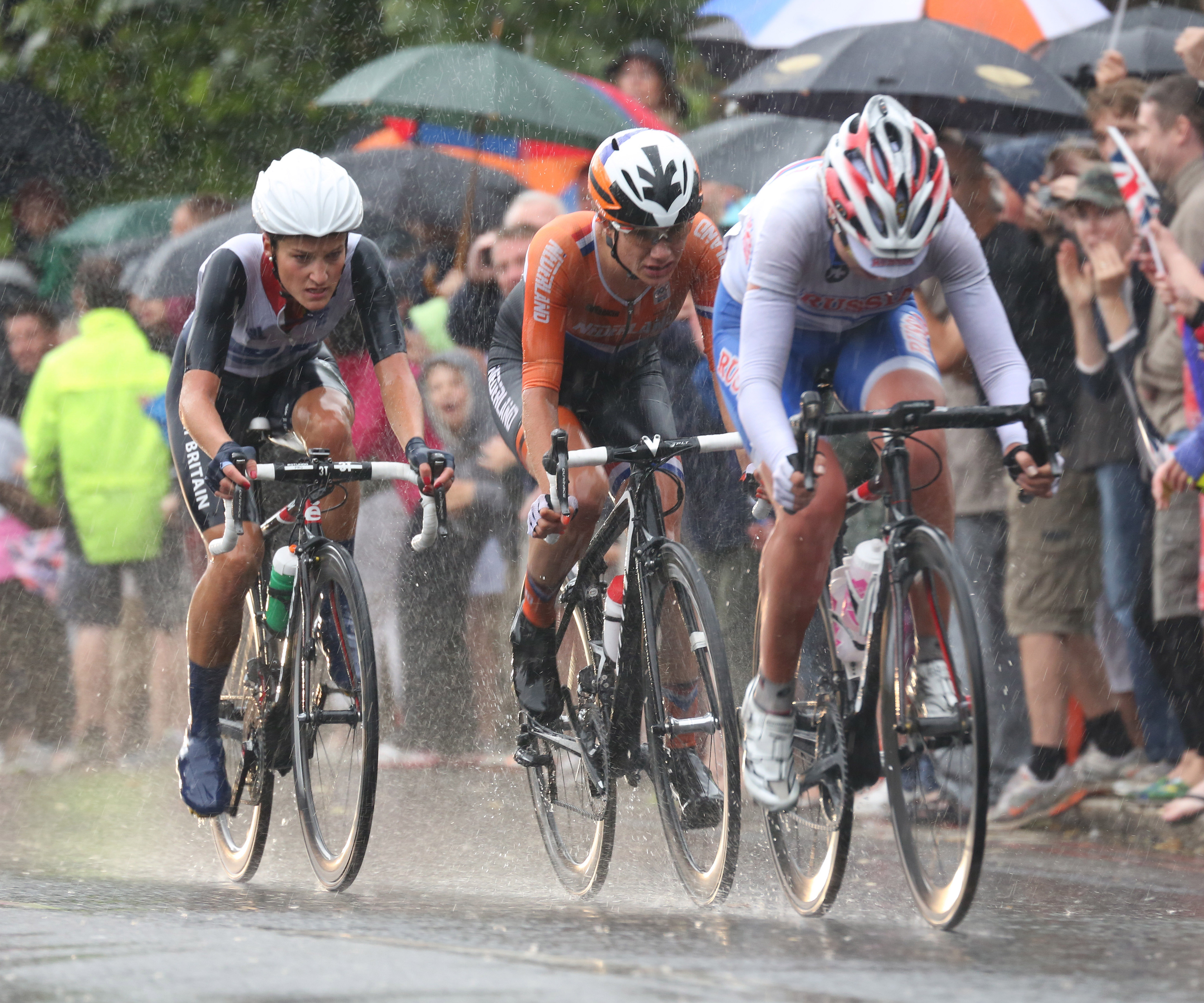
Vos during the road race at the 2012 Summer Olympics.

In 2014, Vos started the year with a record seventh world championship in cyclo-cross. Six of those titles were consecutive. Later in the year, she won the Giro d'Italia Femminile and the first edition of La Course. La Course took place on the last day of the Tour de France for men. The women's race was launched after a successful petition by Le Tour Entier, a group led by Marianne Vos, Emma Pooley, Kathryn Bertine and Chrissie Wellington. She also won the first edition of The Women's Tour.

In 2015, Vos started the year with a 3rd place in the cyclo-cross world championships. She then switched to mountain biking, with an eye on participating in that discipline in the Rio Olympics. She won her first race, but broke a rib preparing for a race in Austria. The rest of her 2015 season was plagued by a persisting hamstring injury. She later announced she was overtrained and would not participate in the 2015–2016 cyclo-cross season.

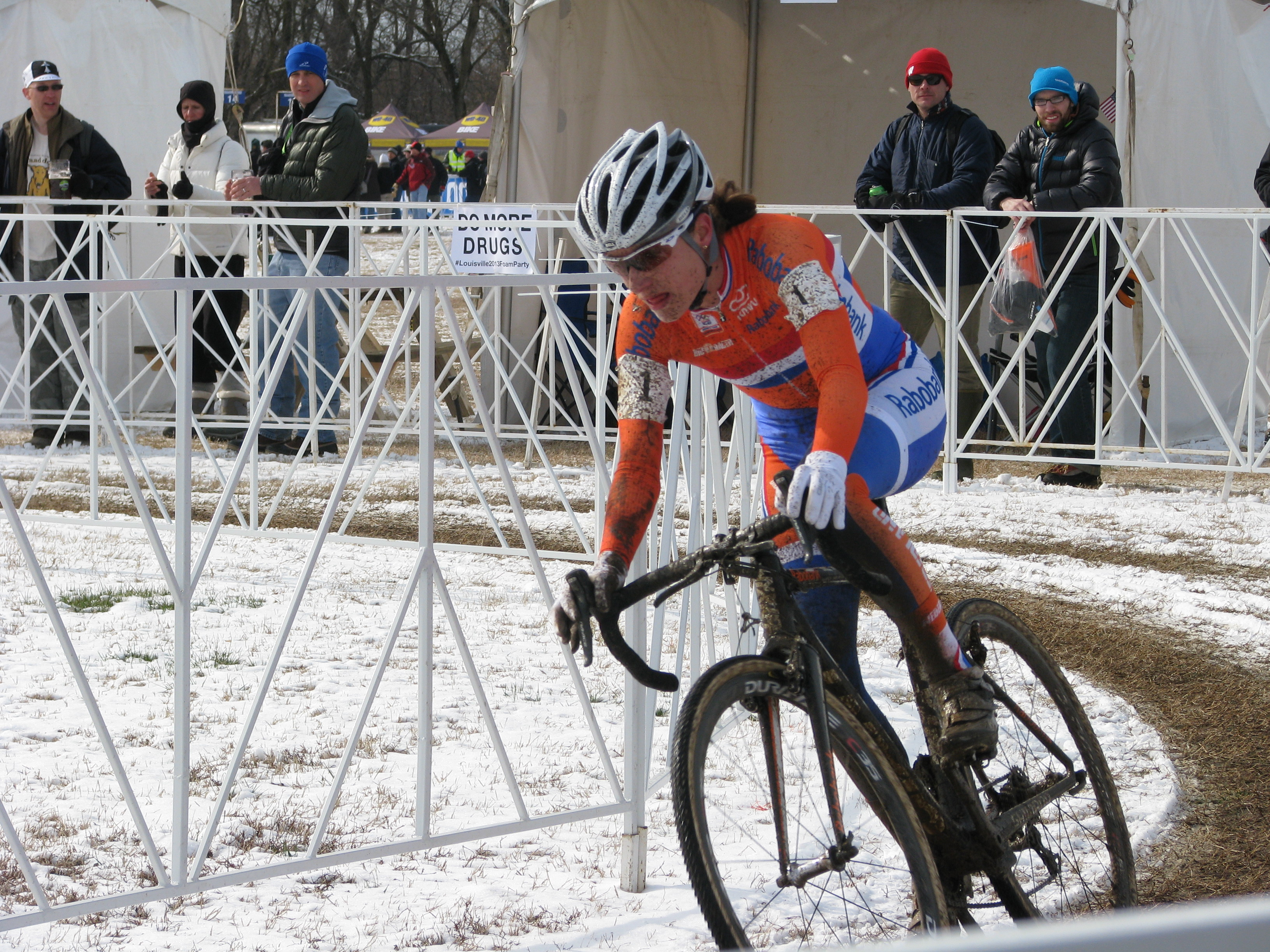
Vos during the 2013 UCI Cyclo-cross World Championships.

In 2016, Vos recovered and won her first World Tour race in stage 3 of the Tour of California. She was one of four women selected for the Dutch national team for the 2016 Summer Olympics that same month. She finished in 9th place in the Olympic road race, which was won by her teammate Anna van der Breggen.

In 2017, Vos won a silver medal at the cyclo-cross world championships. She also won the road race at the European championships in Herning, Denmark and the general classification in the Ladies Tour of Norway stage race.

In 2018, Vos won a silver medal at the 2018 European championships in Glasgow. She also won two Women's World Tour events: the Open de Suède Vårgårda and the Ladies Tour of Norway for the second year running. Vos won all three stages, the general and the points classification of that race.

In 2019, Vos started the year with a bronze medal at the cyclo-cross world championships in Bogense. In March, she won the Trofeo Alfredo Binda for the fourth time. She was now tied with Maria Canins for most wins in this race. In May she won the Tour de Yorkshire and in July she won La Course for the second time. At the end of the year, Vos was the individual champion of the UCI Women's World Tour.

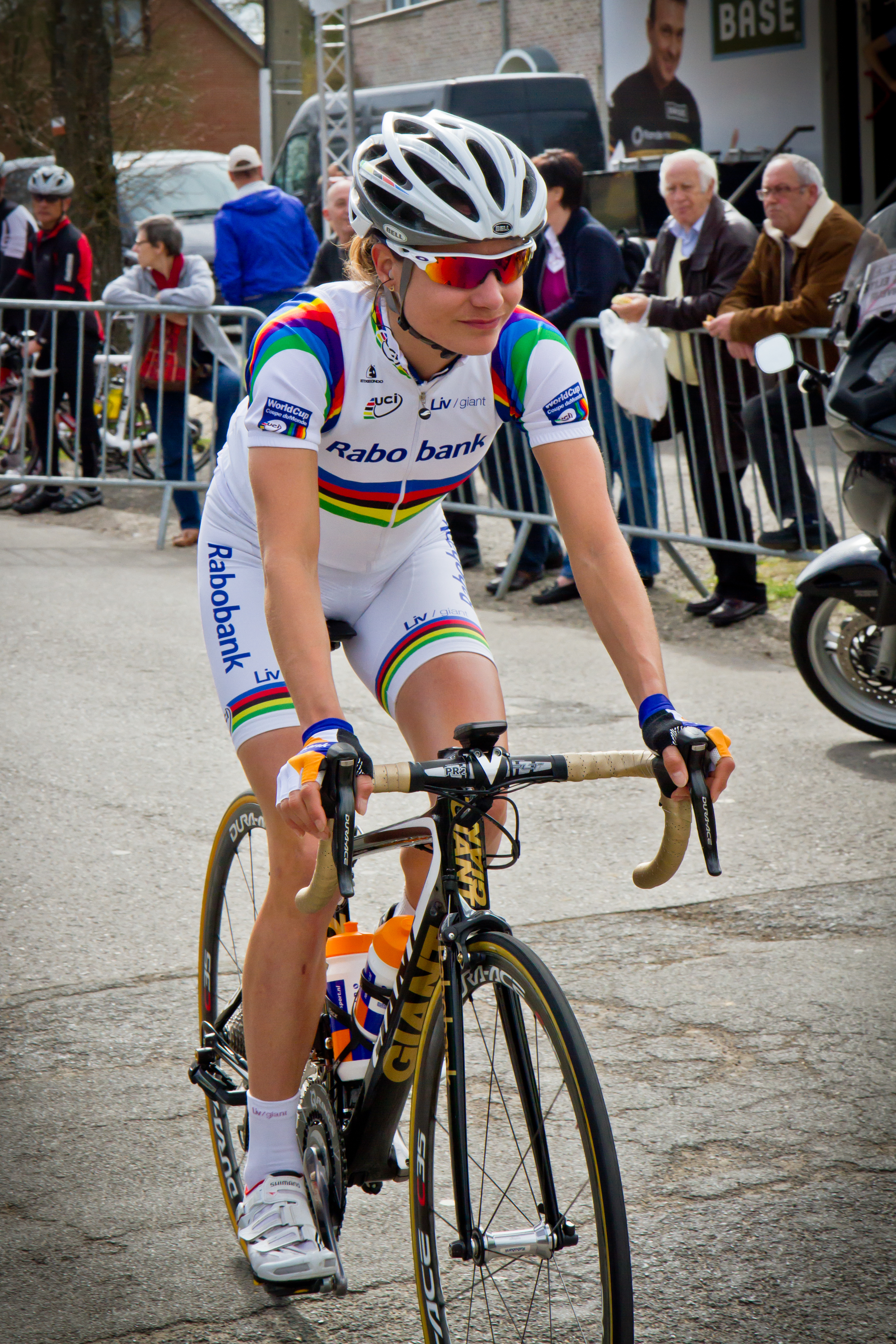
Vos wearing a hybrid jersey, composed of aspects of the rainbow jersey and the UCI Women's World Cup leader's jersey. Her bike also has gold detailing denoting she is the reigning Olympic Champion.

=== 2020s ===
In 2020, Vos won the points classification at the Giro Rosa, as well as 3 stage wins.

In 2021, Vos joined the newly formed Team Jumbo–Visma. In the spring classics, Vos won Gent–Wevelgem and Amstel Gold Race. Later that year, she finished second at the Road World Championships road race in Flanders.

In 2022, Vos started the year with an eighth cyclo-cross world championship title in Fayetteville, Arkansas, at the end of a fierce head-to-head battle with defending champ Lucinda Brand (Netherlands). Vos participated in first edition of Tour de France Femmes. She won stage 2 to Provins, defeating Katarzyna Niewiadoma, Elisa Longo Borghini and Silvia Persico in the sprint. This gave her the overall lead and made her holder of the yellow jersey. She also took the early lead in the points classification. She then won Stage 6 from Saint-Dié-des-Vosges to Rosheim, gaining a comfortable lead in the points classification and making Tour de France history by being the first woman to win a stage while wearing the yellow jersey. As a result, she extended her lead to +0:30 over both Niewiadoma and Persico. She fell out of contention for the yellow jersey after stage 7, but still maintained the lead in the points classification. Even though she had led this classification for several stages, she would wear the green jersey for the first time on the final day of the race. Ultimately, Vos finished 26th in the general classification, 36 mins and 56 secs behind winner Annemiek van Vleuten.

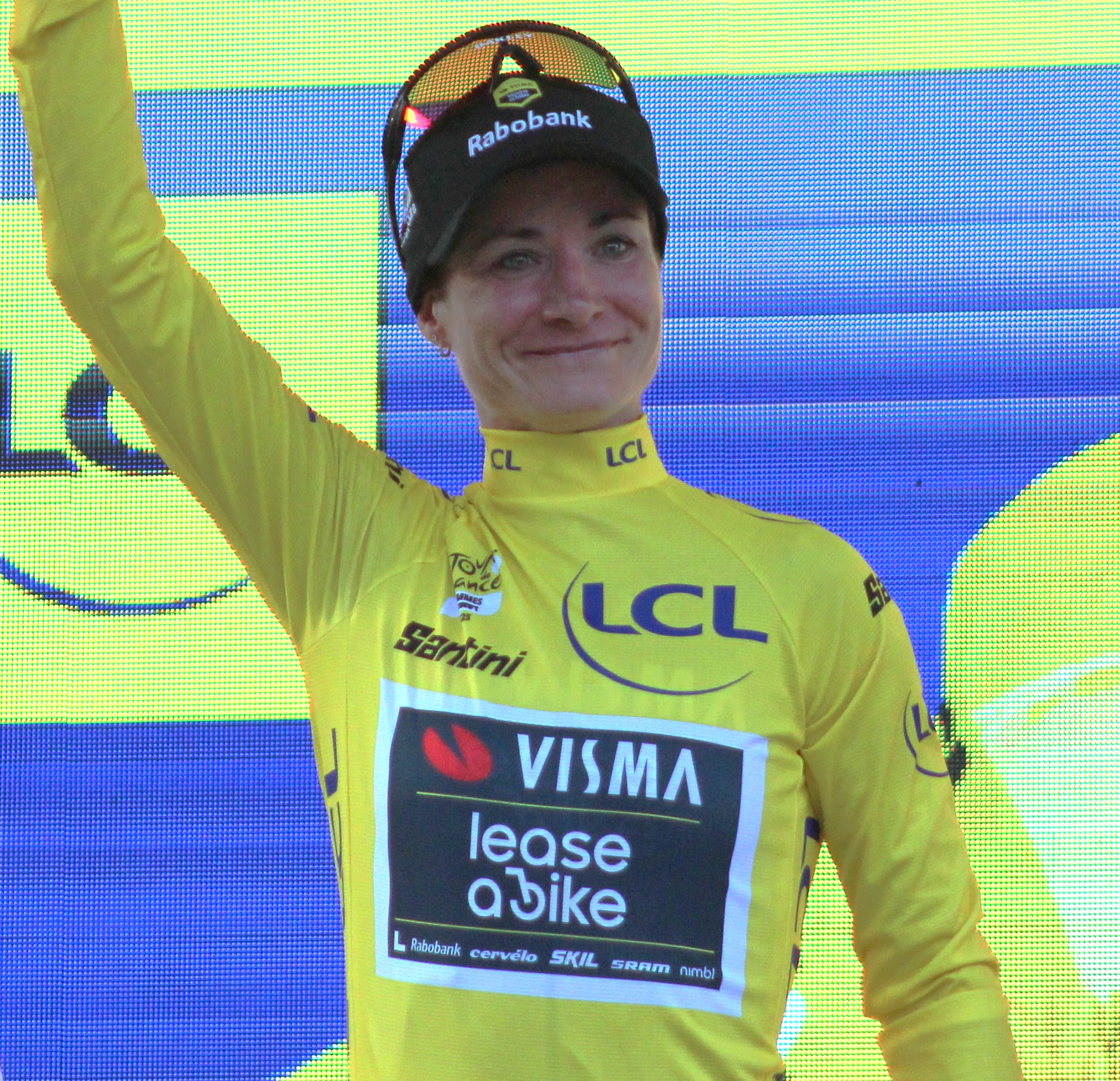
Vos in the yellow jersey at the 2025 Tour de France Femmes

In 2023, Vos won the points classification at La Vuelta Femenina, as well as two stages. Vos abandoned the Tour de France Femmes after six stages in anticipation of the world road race championship – however she finished 47th, nearly 15 minutes behind the winner.

In 2024, Vos won the Amstel Gold Race for the second time. At La Vuelta Femenina, Vos won the points classification for the second year in succession, as well as winning two stages. At the Paris 2024 Olympic Games women's road race, Vos won a silver medal by beating Lotte Kopecky in a sprint for second place. At the Tour de France Femmes, Vos won the points classification for the second time. In October, Vos won the Gravel World Championship, her first world title in the discipline.

In 2025, Vos announced that she had signed an indefinite "lifetime" contract with Visma–Lease a Bike, and would stay with the team until the end of her career. Vos won the points classification at La Vuelta Femenina for the third year in succession, again winning two stages. At the Tour de France Femmes, Vos won the first stage of the race – taking her eighth yellow jersey.

In 2026, Vos won the Gravel World Championships for the second time.

== Outside sports ==
=== Personal life ===
At the first edition of the Tour de France Femmes, following her first stage win, Vos revealed she has been in a relationship with fellow Dutch cyclist Moniek Tenniglo. They have been living together since 2017, and currently reside in Borne, Twente.

=== Charity ===
Vos is an ambassador for the Dutch charity Jeugdsportfonds which financially supports children of poor families who want to join a sports club. She is also an ambassador for Youth United for Sri Lanka (YU4SL), set up by young people to help underprivileged people in Sri Lanka. Speed skater Ireen Wüst and other Dutch celebrities joined Vos as ambassadors.

== Career achievements ==
=== Awards ===
- Cyclingnews.com – Best female rider: 2011, 2012, 2013, 2014
- VeloNews.com – Women's Stage racer of the year: 2014
- VeloNews.com – International Woman of the year: 2013
- Dutch Sportswoman of the year: 2008, 2009, 2013
- Dutch Female cyclist of the year: 2006, 2007, 2008, 2009, 2010, 2011, 2012, 2013
- Cycle Sport Magazine – "Best Cyclist in the World": 2013

== See also ==
- List of Dutch Olympic cyclists
- UCI Women's Road World Cup
- UCI Cyclo-cross World Cup
