= 2021 Tro-Bro Léon =

2021 UCI Europe Tour 2021 UCI ProSeries

Race details
- Dates: 16 May 2021
- Stages: 1
- Distance: 207 km (128.6 mi)
- Winning time: 5h 18' 38"

Results
	Winner	Connor Swift (GBR)	(Arkéa–Samsic)
	Second	Piet Allegaert (BEL)	(Cofidis)
	Third	Baptiste Planckaert (BEL)	(Intermarché–Wanty–Gobert Matériaux)

The 2021 Tro-Bro Léon was the 37th edition of Tro-Bro Léon, a one-day road cycling race in the northwestern French region of Brittany, that took place on 16 May 2021. The 1.Pro-category race was initially scheduled to be a part of the inaugural edition of the UCI ProSeries, but after the 2020 edition was cancelled due to the COVID-19 pandemic, it made its UCI ProSeries debut in 2021, while also still being a part of the 2021 UCI Europe Tour. It was also the fourth event of the 2021 French Road Cycling Cup.

This year's edition was the first since its move to the new mid-May time slot from its usual late April time slot. The race started and finished in Lannilis, and covered 207 kilometres (129 mi) of the rolling and windy roads of Brittany. Interspersed along the route were 26 ribinoù sections totalling 30.6 kilometres (19.0 mi).

== Teams ==
Six of the nineteen UCI WorldTeams, eleven UCI ProTeams, and four UCI Continental teams made up the twenty-one teams that participated in the race. Each team was allowed to field up to seven riders, but many teams chose to enter less than the maximum: Intermarché–Wanty–Gobert Matériaux and Total Direct Énergie each entered five riders, while Alpecin–Fenix, Bingoal Pauwels Sauces WB, Burgos BH, EF Education–Nippo, and Equipo Kern Pharma each entered six. With two late scratches, 136 riders started the race, of which 86 finished.

UCI WorldTeams

- AG2R Citroën Team
- Cofidis
- EF Education–Nippo
- Groupama–FDJ
- Intermarché–Wanty–Gobert Matériaux
- Lotto–Soudal

UCI ProTeams

- Alpecin–Fenix
- Arkéa–Samsic
- B&B Hotels p/b KTM
- Bingoal Pauwels Sauces WB
- Burgos BH
- Delko
- Equipo Kern Pharma
- Euskaltel–Euskadi
- Rally Cycling
- Total Direct Énergie
- Uno-X Pro Cycling Team

UCI Continental Teams

- BEAT Cycling
- Riwal Cycling Team
- St. Michel–Auber93
- Xelliss–Roubaix–Lille Métropole

== Result ==
Result
Rank	Rider	Team	Time
1	Connor Swift (GBR)	Arkéa–Samsic	5h 18' 38"
2	Piet Allegaert (BEL)	Cofidis	+ 0"
3	Baptiste Planckaert (BEL)	Intermarché–Wanty–Gobert Matériaux	+ 0"
4	Olivier Le Gac (FRA)	Groupama–FDJ	+ 0"
5	Rasmus Tiller (NOR)	Uno-X Pro Cycling Team	+ 0"
6	John Degenkolb (GER)	Lotto–Soudal	+ 26"
7	Oliver Naesen (BEL)	AG2R Citroën Team	+ 26"
8	Bram Welten (NED)	Arkéa–Samsic	+ 26"
9	Christophe Laporte (FRA)	Cofidis	+ 26"
10	Kevin Geniets (LUX)	Groupama–FDJ	+ 26"
