= 2021–22 UCI Gravel World Series =

Season of bicycle racing competition

- First edition of the UCI Gravel World Series

Details
- Dates: 3 April – 18 September 2022
- Location: Philippines; Australia; France; Poland; United States; Sweden; Belgium; Italy; Netherlands; Spain
- Races: 11

The 2022–23 UCI Gravel World Series was the inaugural edition of the UCI Gravel World Series. It was a season-long series of 11 gravel cycling events organized by the UCI that took place between 3 April 2022 and 18 September 2022. The event was open to pro as well as amateur riders and the top 25% riders in each category in each event qualified for the inaugural 2022 UCI Gravel World Championships.

== Calendar & Results ==
Originally there were 12 events planned, but Jingle GX Gravel Race at Amana got cancelled.

#	Date	Race	Location	Longest Distance	Winner		Ref
#	Date	Race	Location	Longest Distance	Men	Women	Ref
1	3 April 2022	UCI Gravel Philippines	(Philippines) Bongabon	85 km	Riemon Lapaza (PHI)	Melisa Jane Jaroda (PHI)	
2	15 May 2022	Seven	(Australia) Nannup	125 km	Adam Blazevic (AUS)	Maria Madigan (AUS)	
3	5 June 2022	Wish One Millau Grands Causses	(France) Millau	130 km	Niki Terpstra (NED)	Tessa Neefjes (NED)	
4	18 June 2022	Gravel Adventure	(Poland) Świeradów-Zdrój	100 km	Christian Kreuchler (GER)	Maja Wloszczowska (POL)	
5	25 June 2022	Highlands Gravel Classic	(United States) Fayetteville	106 km	Andrew Evans (USA)	Lenny Ramsey (USA)	
6	20 August 2022	Gravel Grit ’n Grind	(Sweden) Halmstad	133 km	Jasper Ockeloen (NED)	Svenja Betz (GER)	
7	27 August 2022	Houffa Gravel	(Belgium) Houffalize	110 km	Jasper Ockeloen (NED)	Tessa Neefjes (NED)	
8	3 September 2022	La Monsterrato-Strade Bianche Monferrato	(Italy) Quattordio	125 km	Piotr Havik (NED)	Svenja Betz (GER)	
9	4 September 2022	Gravelista	(Australia) Beechworth	113 km	Adam Blazevic (AUS)	Justine Barrow (AUS)	
10	17 September 2022	Gravel One Fifty	(Netherlands) Veenhuizen	150 km	Andreas Stokbro (DEN)	Carolin Schiff (GER)	
11	18 September 2022	Ranxo	(Spain) Ponts	166 km	Carlos Verona (ESP)	Marta Romeu Solaz (ESP)	
