= UCI Gravel World Championships =

Annual international cycling competition

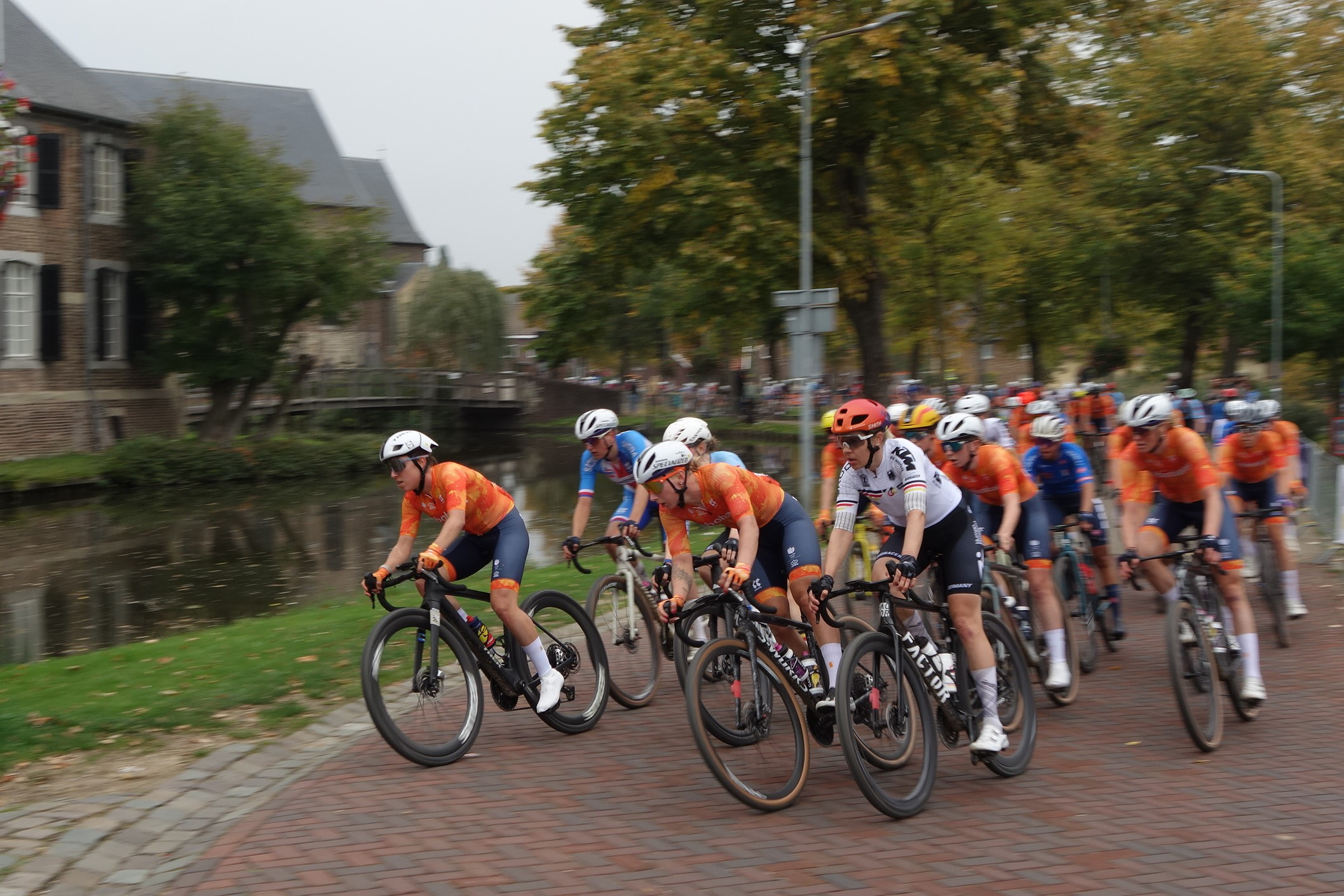
- Peloton during the women's elite race at the 2025 UCI Gravel World Championships
- Status: Active
- Genre: Sports event
- Date: October
- Frequency: Annual
- Inaugurated: 2022
- Organiser: Union Cycliste Internationale

The UCI Gravel World Championships are the world championship events for gravel cycling organised by the Union Cycliste Internationale (UCI). Competitors ride on courses with mostly unpaved roads, distinct from other cycling disciplines like road, cyclo-cross, and mountain biking. The championships are held in October at the end of the UCI Gravel World Series, which serves as a qualifying event.

The top three finishers at the world championships are awarded gold, silver, and bronze medals. The winner is also entitled to wear the rainbow jersey in gravel racing events for the following year. The competitors in the world championships represent national rather than commercial teams.

== Regulations ==
The UCI requires a gravel cycling course consist of at least 60% unsurfaced roads, including gravel, forest, or cobblestone roads. Unlike the other off-road cycling disciplines of cyclo-cross and mountain biking, features such as stairs, drops, jumps, or steep sections requiring the rider to dismount are not allowed. For the gravel world championships, the UCI additionally mandates that all bikes have drop bars.

To qualify for the world championships, a rider must finish in the top 25% of their age group category at a UCI Gravel World Series event. Reigning national or continental champions are automatically qualified for the elite race, and each national cycling federation gets wildcard entries to grant to their best riders.

== History ==
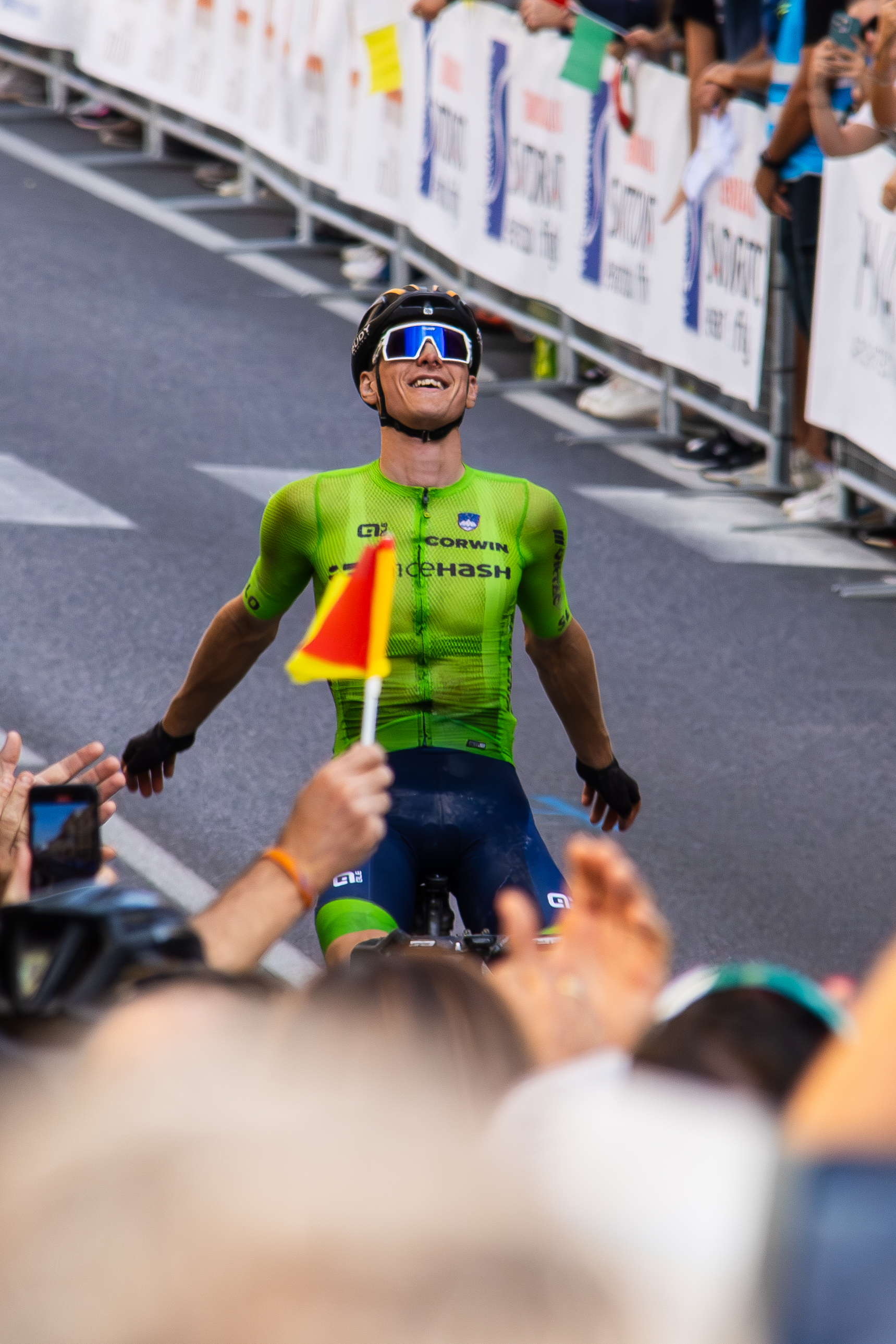
Matej Mohorič winning the men's elite race in 2023.

Cyclist have ridden on unpaved roads since the invention of the bicycle in the 19th century, but gravel cycling as a distinct discipline only gained popularity in the early 2000s with the foundation of races like Unbound Gravel (originally called "Dirty Kanza") in Kansas. These events were not sanctioned by any central body, although some events such as Gravel Worlds in Nebraska branded themselves as a world championship. In 2021, the UCI announced a sanctioned world championships and world series for the following year, officially adding gravel cycling as the 10th UCI discipline.

In 2022, the inaugural championships were held in Veneto, Italy in 2022. Unlike many mass start gravel races, the men's and women's races were different distances—194 km (121 mi) for men and 140 km (87 mi) for women—and held on different days. The event was criticized for only using gravel roads for 18% of the total course, with Lance Branquinho of Road.cc calling it "more akin to traditional road racing" than a "genuine" gravel race. The inaugural champions were Pauline Ferrand-Prévot in the women's race and Gianni Vermeersch in the men's race. The 2023 championships were held in Veneto again, with a new course that featured twice as much climbing and more gravel roads.

== Editions ==
Year	Country	Venue	Men Elite winner	Women Elite winner
2022	Italy	Veneto	Gianni Vermeersch (BEL)	Pauline Ferrand-Prévot (FRA)
2023	Italy	Veneto	Matej Mohorič (SLO)	Katarzyna Niewiadoma (POL)
2024	Belgium	Flemish Brabant	Mathieu van der Poel (NED)	Marianne Vos (NED)
2025	Netherlands	South Limburg	Florian Vermeersch (BEL)	Lorena Wiebes (NED)
2026	Australia	Nannup	Magnus Bak Klaris (DEN)	Marianne Vos (NED)
2027	France	Haute Savoie	TBD	
2028	Saudi Arabia	Al-'Ula	TBD	
2029	Switzerland	Villars-sur-Ollon	TBD	
2030	Belgium	Turnhout	TBD	

== All medals ==
Updated after 2026 UCI Gravel World Championships.

Rank	Nation	Gold	Silver	Bronze	Total
1	Netherlands	4	2	4	10
2	Belgium	2	4	1	7
3	Slovenia	1	0	1	2
4	Denmark	1	0	0	1
4	France	1	0	0	1
4	Poland	1	0	0	1
7	Italy	0	2	2	4
8	Germany	0	1	0	1
8	Switzerland	0	1	0	1
10	Great Britain	0	0	2	2
Totals (10 entries)		10	10	10	30
