= UCI Gravel World Series =

Annual series of gravel cycling races

Race details
- Date: From October each year to September the following year
- Discipline: Gravel cycling
- Organiser: UCI
- Web site: ucigravelworldseries.com

History
- First edition: 2022

The UCI Gravel World Series is a season-long series of races in gravel cycling, organised by the UCI. First held in 2022, the format is similar to mass participation road events in Gran Fondo or cyclosportive fashion where several age categories as well as Elite Men and Women take part. Each race serves as the qualification venue for UCI Gravel World Championships and the top 25% of each race in each category are qualified for the UCI Gravel World Championships at the end of the season.

The series for each season starts after the UCI Gravel World Championships (usually in October) and continues until the subsequent UCI Gravel World Championships the next October.

== History ==
The first edition was held in 2022 consisting of 11 races in ten countries to serve as the qualification for the inaugural world championships in Veneto. In the following editions the number of events in the series expanded. In the 2024–25 season both 2024 and 2025 editions of the UEC Gravel European Championships were included in the series.

Season	Period	Number of events
2021–22	3 April – 18 September 2022	11
2022–23	23 April – 2 September 2023	16
2023–24	28 October 2023 – 22 September 2024	25
2024–25	13 October 2024 – 21 September 2025	34
2025–26	19 October 2025 – 26 September 2026	47

== See also ==
- UCI Gravel World Championships
- UCI Gran Fondo World Championships
