= Amy Dombroski =

American cyclist (1987–2013)

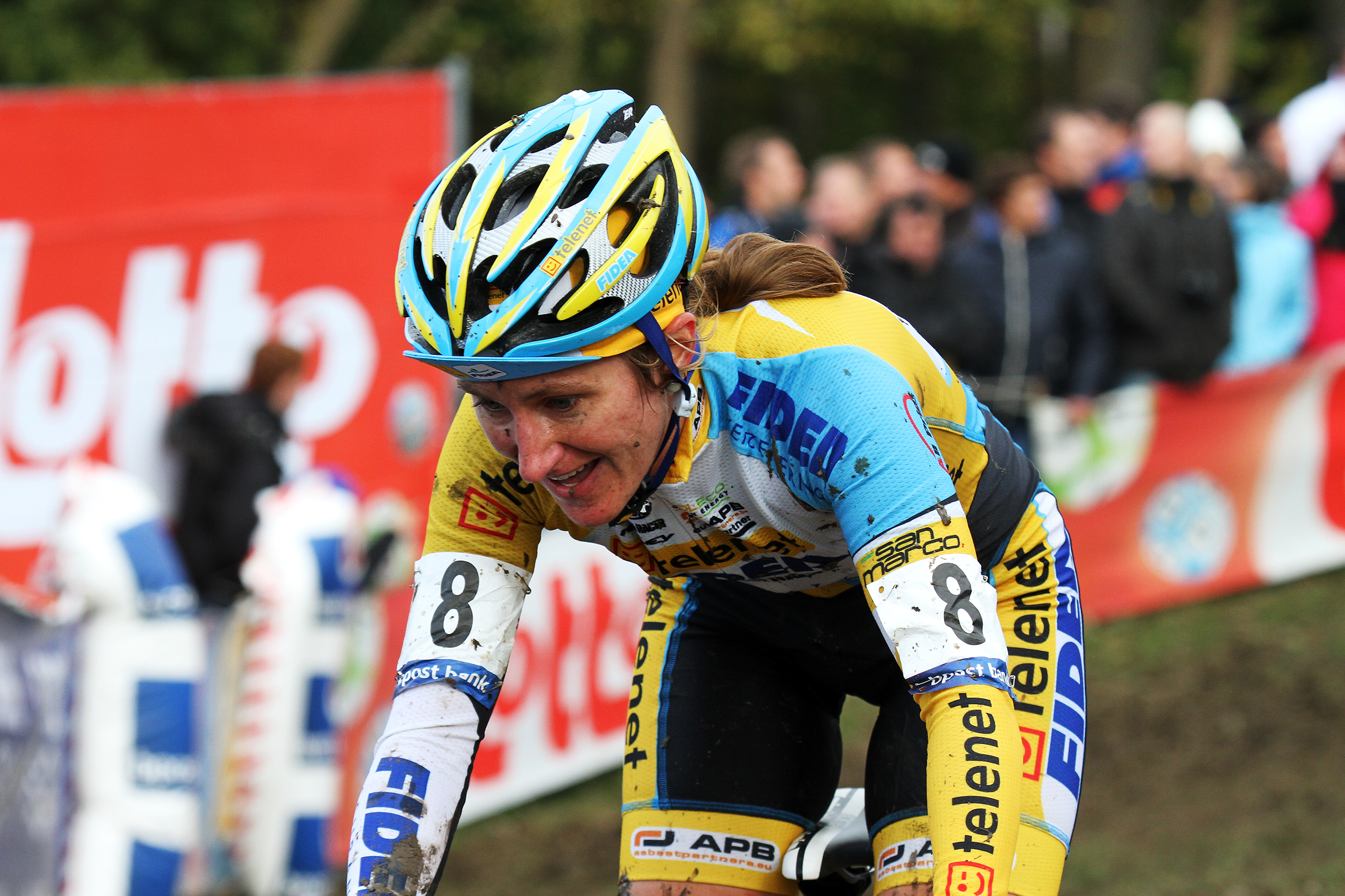

Personal information
- Full name: Amy Alison Dombroski
- Nickname: Cross Diva
- Born: September 9, 1987 Vermont, United States
- Died: October 3, 2013 (aged 26) Begijnendijk, Belgium

Cycling career
- Sport: Cycling
- Disciplines: Cyclo-cross; Mountain biking; Road

Amateur teams
- 2006–2007: Excel Sports Boulder
- 2007–2009: Velo Bella–Kona

Professional teams
- 2008: Richard Sachs–RGM–Radix
- 2009–2010: Schlamm p/b Primus Mootry
- 2010–2011: Luna Pro Team
- 2011–2012: Crankbrothers
- 2012–2013: Telenet–Fidea
Medal record
Women's cycling
Representing United States
U.S. National Championship – Cyclocross
Gold medal – first place	2006	Women U23
Gold medal – first place	2007	Women U23
U.S. National Championship – MTB
Gold medal – first place	2009	Women U23
U.S. National Championship – Road
Gold medal – first place	2009	Women U23

Amy Alison Dombroski (September 9, 1987 – October 3, 2013) was an American professional cyclist, who competed in cyclocross, road, and mountain bike racing. An American National Champion in Road (2009 U23), Cyclocross (2010, 2012, 2013), and Mountain Bike (2009), Dombroski also competed internationally, representing the United States at UCI World Championship Cyclocross, UCI World Cup Cyclocross, and UCI World Championship Cross Country Mountain Biking (2009 U23) events.

Transitioning from alpine ski racing to cycle racing in 2006, Dombroski's international cyclocross career began in 2007, with a grassroots fundraising initiative undertaken by her team, Velo Bella. The team sold equipment and special edition socks to generate funds to send Dombroski to compete in the 2008 UCI Cyclocross World Championships in Treviso, Italy.

Originally from Vermont, Dombroski moved to Boulder, Colorado, where she climbed the ranks of women's cyclocross in the U.S. before moving to Belgium in the 2011–2012 season, to train and compete on the UCI World Cup cyclocross circuit. Dombroski met with success on the circuit, placing second in Leuven behind Sanne Cant, and achieving top ten finishes at the cyclocross events in Otegem, Heerlen, Hoogstraten, Diegem, Overijse, Antwerp, Gavere, Zogge, Zonhoven, Ruddervoorde, Kalmthout, and Neerpelt. Dombroski's nickname Cross Diva stems from a disagreement regarding the mandatory use of sponsored equipment, as well as Dombroski's petite stature and efforts to promote gender equality for cyclists' pay.

== Death and legacy ==
Dombroski died on October 3, 2013, at age 26, after she was struck by a truck during a moto-paced training ride in Belgium.

=== Amy D. Foundation ===
Following her death, Dombroski's brother Dan Dombroski and sister-in-law Nicole Novembre established the Amy D. Foundation, a nonprofit organization with a mission to empower young women through cycling. The Foundation logo, a heart with a lightning bolt through it, was designed to emulate a wrist tattoo commissioned by Amy Dombroski following the death of her mother.

Since inception, the Foundation has operated mountain bike camps for girls age 7 through 14 (in cooperation with the Boulder-based organization, Little Bellas), started a women's race team, and advocated for gender equality in payouts at cycling events.

=== Other tributes ===
In 2013, the race promoters of the UCI Colorado Cross Classic and Boulder Cup events organized a one lap ride in Dombroski's honor; over 100 participants attended raising over US$10,000 for the Amy D. Foundation. Also in 2013, the Bicycle Racing Association of Colorado renamed its pre-junior cycling program the Amy Dombroski Pre-J Program in Dombroski's honor.

Handlebar Mustache Apparel, a cycling apparel company located in Boulder, CO, has an Amy D. line; which features the Amy D. Foundation's logo. All proceeds are donated to the Amy D. Foundation.

== Major results ==
2006
1st Under-23 race, National Cyclo-cross Championships
2007
1st Under-23 race, National Cyclo-cross Championships
2008
5th National Cyclo-cross Championships
2009
1st Under-23 cross-country, National Mountain Bike Championships
National Road Championships

1st Under-23 road race
4th Road race

3rd Providence
3rd Verge New England Cyclocross (UCI C2)
7th Planet Bike Cup, U.S. Gran Prix of Cyclocross (UCI C2)
2012
2nd Soudal Classic Leuven, Belgium
