= Lise Müller =

Danish politician (born 1974)

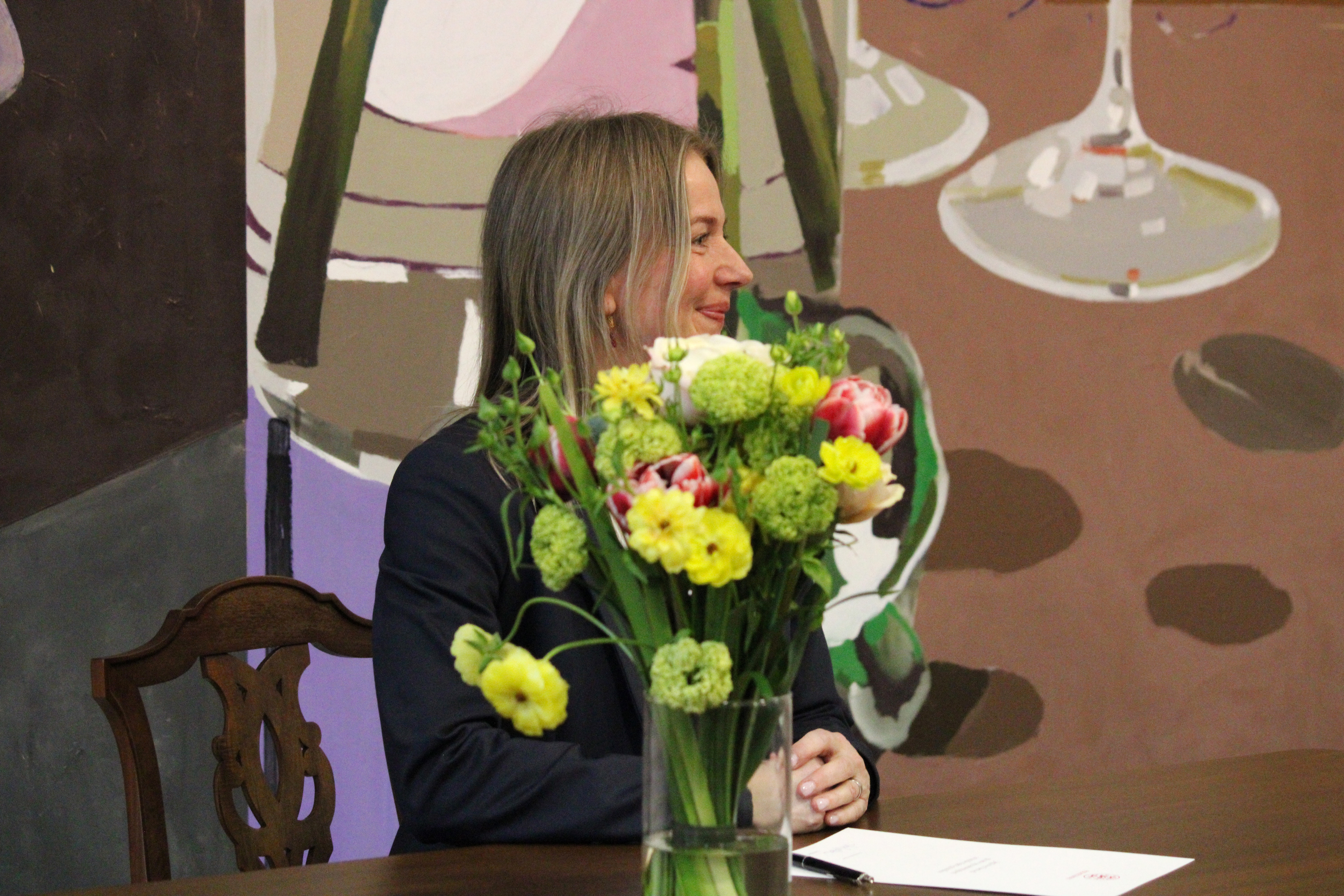
- Müller in 2026

Member of the Danish Parliament
- Incumbent
- Assumed office 24 March 2026

Personal details
- Born: 21 January 1974 (age 52) Egedesminde
- Party: Green Left

Lise Müller (born 21 January 1974) is a Danish politician who is the deputy chairman of the Green Left. She was elected to the Folketing in 2026. She is a former regional council member in the Capital Region of Denmark for the party.

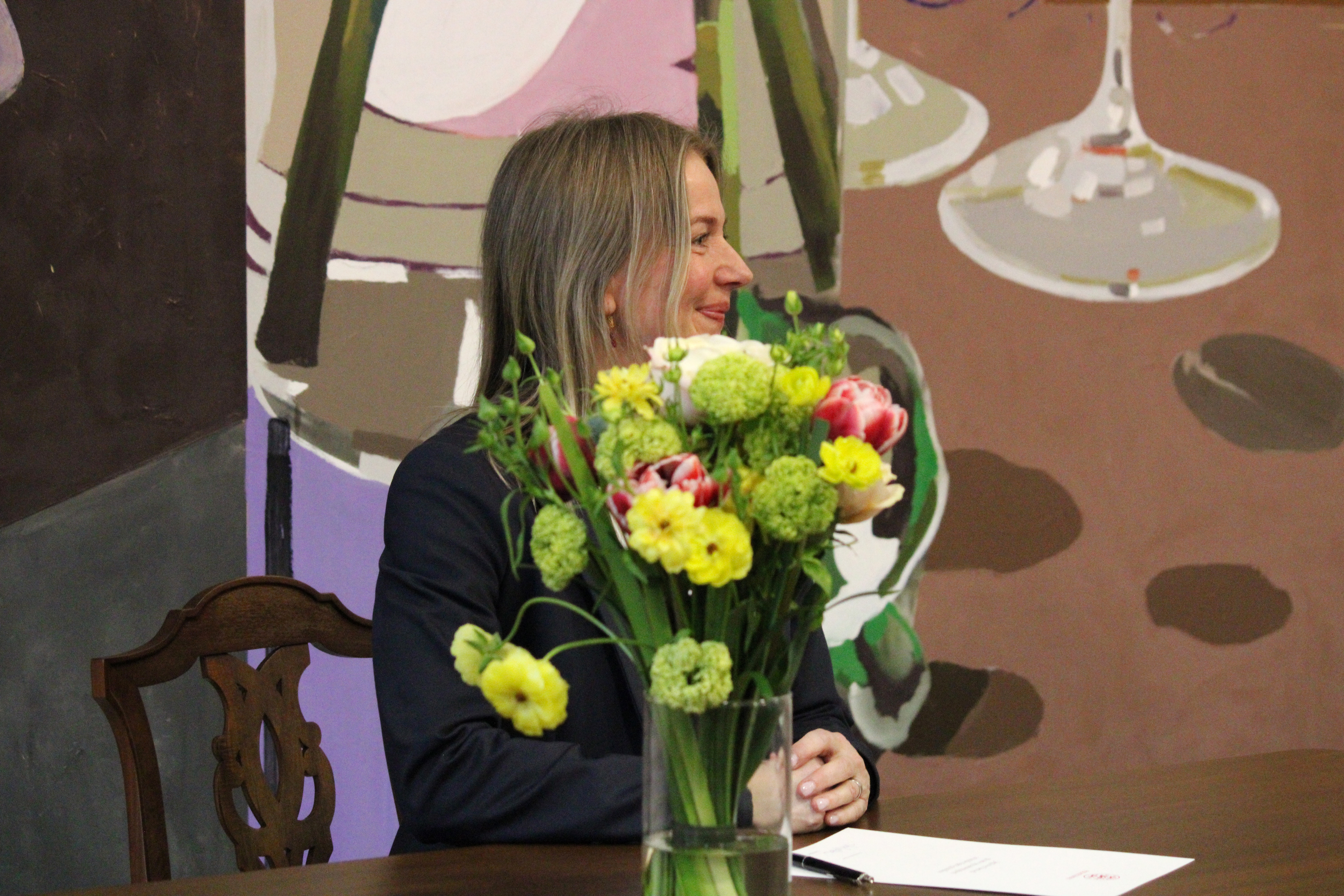
Müller signing a pledge to uphold the Danish Constitution at Christiansborg, 14 April 2026

She is a qualified nurse from Hovedstadens Sygehusfællesskab nursing education in 1999 and a master's degree in health education from the Danish University of Education in 2006. In her civilian career, she has worked at Rigshospitalet, at Coloplast and in Frederiksberg Municipality. Since 2017, she has been a home nurse in Gladsaxe Municipality.

== See also ==
- List of members of the Folketing, 2026–present
