= Lannilis =

Lannilis Lanniliz
- Commune
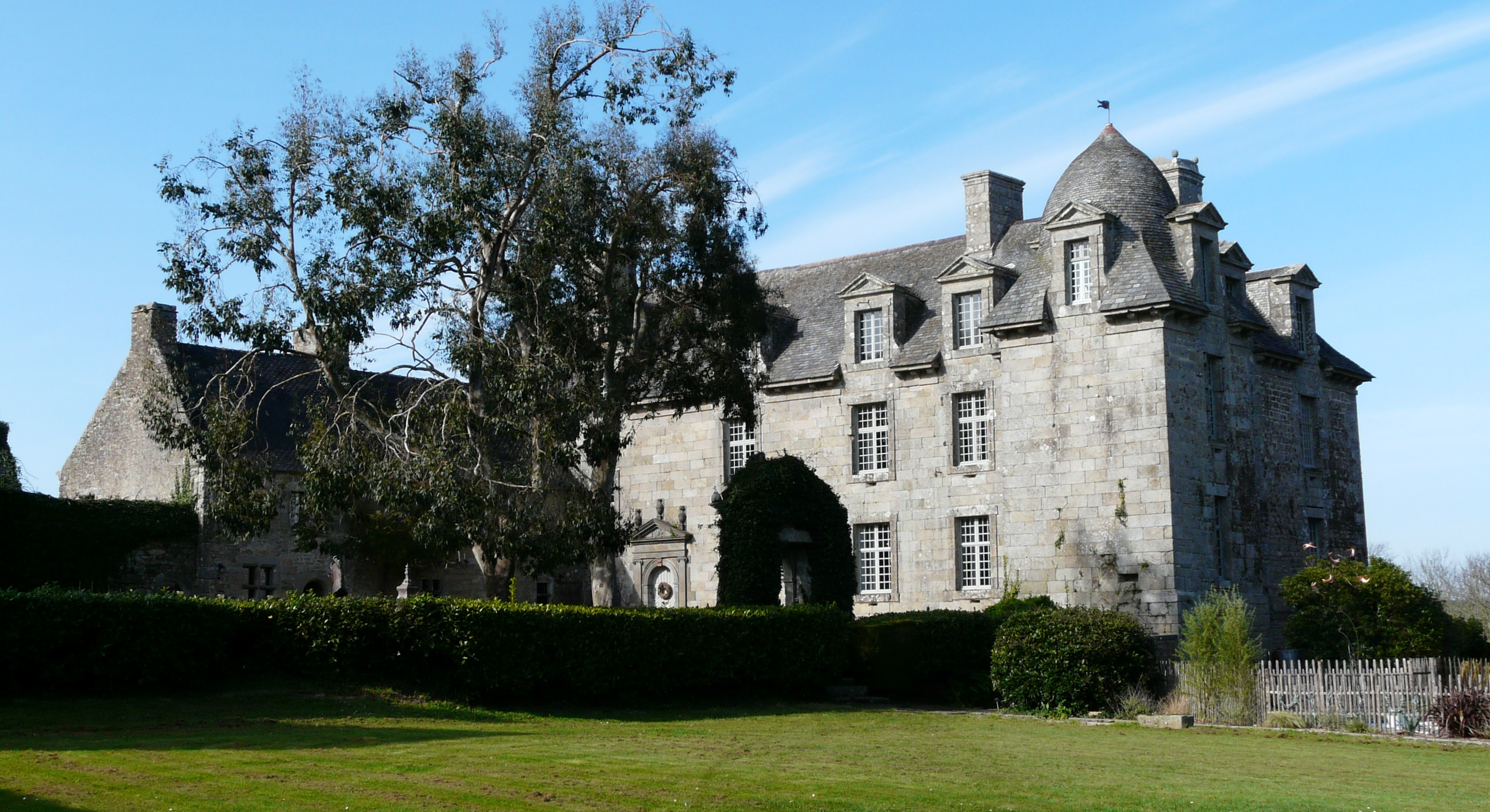
- The Chateau of Kerouartz

- Coat of arms
- Location of Lannilis
- Location within France Location within Brittany
- Coordinates: 48°34′15″N 4°31′08″W
- Country: France
- Region: Brittany
- Department: Finistère
- Arrondissement: Brest
- Canton: Plabennec

Government
  - Mayor (2020–2026): Jean-François Tréguer
- Area^{1}: 23.52 km^{2} (9.08 sq mi)
- Highest elevation: 58 m (190 ft)
- Lowest elevation: 0 m (0 ft)
- Population (2023): 5,709
  - Density: 242.7/km^{2} (628.7/sq mi)
- Time zone: UTC+01:00 (CET)
  - Summer (DST): UTC+02:00 (CEST)
- INSEE/Postal code: 29117 /29870
- ^{1} French Land Register data, which excludes lakes, ponds, glaciers > 1 km^{2} (0.386 sq mi or 247 acres) and river estuaries.

Lannilis (French pronunciation: [lanilis]; Breton: Lanniliz) is a commune in the Finistère department of Brittany in north-western France.

== Population ==
Inhabitants of Lannilis are called in French Lannilisiens.

Historical population

Year	Pop.	±% p.a.
1793	2,471	—
1800	3,112	+3.35%
1806	3,315	+1.06%
1821	2,866	−0.97%
1831	3,179	+1.04%
1836	3,094	−0.54%
1841	3,124	+0.19%
1846	3,361	+1.47%
1851	3,430	+0.41%
1856	3,386	−0.26%
1861	3,326	−0.36%
1866	3,318	−0.05%
1872	3,318	+0.00%
1876	3,270	−0.36%
1881	3,225	−0.28%
1886	3,231	+0.04%
1891	3,323	+0.56%
1896	3,363	+0.24%
1901	3,406	+0.25%

Year	Pop.	±% p.a.
1906	3,553	+0.85%
1911	3,591	+0.21%
1921	3,312	−0.81%
1926	3,527	+1.27%
1931	3,550	+0.13%
1936	3,430	−0.69%
1946	3,750	+0.90%
1954	3,432	−1.10%
1962	3,612	+0.64%
1968	3,556	−0.26%
1975	3,686	+0.51%
1982	3,939	+0.95%
1990	4,272	+1.02%
1999	4,473	+0.51%
2007	5,016	+1.44%
2012	5,349	+1.29%
2017	5,592	+0.89%
2023	5,709	+0.35%

Source: EHESS and INSEE (1968-2023)

== Breton language ==
The municipality launched a linguistic plan concerning the Breton language through Ya d'ar brezhoneg on 27 June 2008.

In 2008, 33.17% of primary-school children attended bilingual schools.

== History ==
A population of Cacous, a persecuted minority of ropemakers, still lived isolated in the village of Trebirou [Trobérou] in Lannilis in 1847.

== See also ==
- Communes of the Finistère department
