= Wendy Simms (cyclist) =

Canadian cyclist

- Simms racing at Turkey Cross 2007, Victoria BC

Personal information
- Born: May 22, 1972 (age 54) Canada

Cycling career
- Sport: Cycling
- Current team: Ridley
- Discipline: Mountain Cyclocross
- Role: Rider

Wendy Simms (born May 22, 1972) is a Canadian professional racing cyclist.

== Career highlights ==
Year	Place	Competition	Country
2004	1st	National Championship, Cyclo-cross, Elite, Canada (F)	(CAN)
2005	1st	National Championship, Cyclo-cross, Elite, Canada (F), Dieppe, New Brunswick	(CAN)
2005	2nd	Aurora, Cyclo-cross (F)	(CAN)
2006	1st	Redmond, Cyclo-cross (F)	(USA)
2006	3rd	Gloucester, Cyclo-cross (b) (F), Gloucester	(USA)
2006	2nd	National Championship, Cyclo-cross, Elite, Canada (F), Nanaimo	(CAN)
2006	3rd	Lakewood, Cyclo-cross (F)	(USA)
2007	3rd	Redmond, Cyclo-cross (F)	(USA)
2007	3rd	Lakewood, Cyclo-cross (F)	(USA)
2007	1st	Edmonton, Cyclo-cross (F)	(CAN)
2007	1st	National Championship, Cyclo-cross, Elite, Canada (F), Kamloops BC	(CAN)
2007	1st	Etobicoke, Cyclo-cross (F)	(CAN)
2007	1st	Etobicoke, Cyclo-cross (b) (F)	(CAN)
2008	2nd	Pétange, Cyclo-cross (F)	(LUX)
2008	1st	National Championship, Cyclo-cross, Elite, Canada (F), Edmonton AB	(CAN)
2010	1st	National Championship, Cyclo-cross, Elite, Canada (F), Toronto ON	(CAN)
