= Church of St. Alexandra, Stanisławowo =

Orthodox church in Stanisławowo, Poland

Church of St. Alexandra
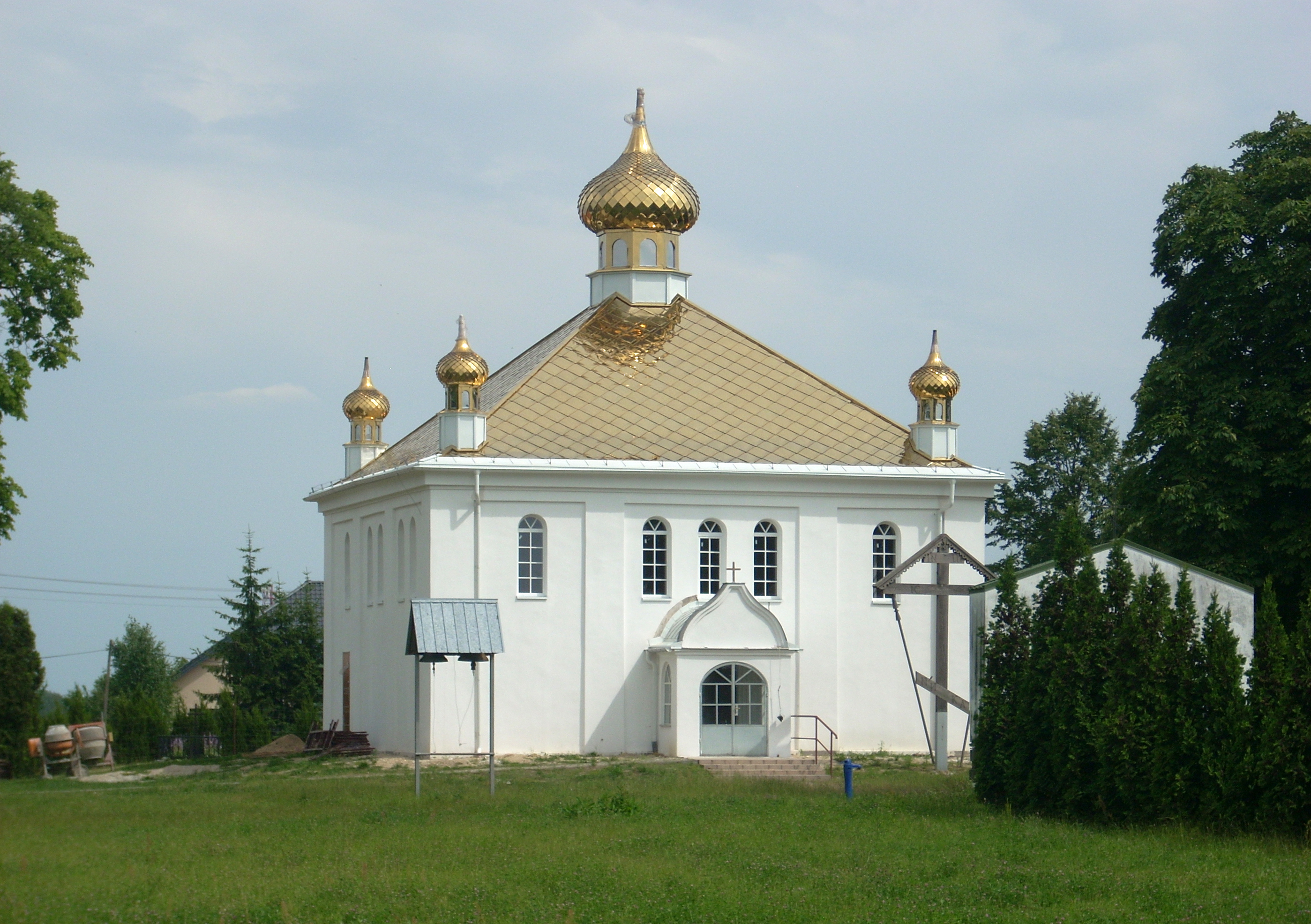
- Church during renovations in 2014
- Church of St. Alexandra
- 52°27′49.0″N 20°43′21.0″E
- Location: Stanisławowo
- Country: Poland
- Denomination: Eastern Orthodoxy
- Churchmanship: Polish Orthodox Church

History
- Status: active Orthodox church
- Dedication: Alexandra of Rome
- Dedicated: 15 May 2016

Architecture
- Architect: Bogdan Lewandowski
- Completed: 1935

Specifications
- Materials: brick

Administration
- Diocese: Diocese of Warsaw and Bielsk

The Church of St. Alexandra is an Orthodox parish church in Stanisławowo. It belongs to the Warsaw Deanery of the Diocese of Warsaw and Bielsk of the Polish Orthodox Church.

The first church in Stanisławowo was built between 1844 and 1846 for Orthodox settlers from the Pskov Governorate, who had been brought in the previous decade and settled in Polish villages near the Modlin Fortress, which was being expanded after the November Uprising. The five-domed brick church was designed by Jan Jakub Gay. It remained in use until 1915, when the Orthodox population was evacuated deep into Russia. The abandoned church suffered significant damage during the battles for Modlin Fortress and was dismantled in the interwar period. A new, smaller, and more modest Orthodox church was built on the same site using materials from the demolished structure. The iconostasis and icons from the dismantled St. George's Cathedral in Modlin were placed inside.

During World War II, the church was again severely damaged, and after the war, most local parishioners were forcibly relocated to the Soviet Union. The building was restored for liturgical use in the early 1990s; previously, services had been held in an adapted room in the parish house. In 2016, another renovation was completed, including the construction and gilding of new domes.

The church is located along the main street of Stanisławowo on a spacious plot, which also houses the Orthodox Care Home Betania. The entrance to the church grounds is on the southern side, facing the street. Within the church property, the old gate from the now-vanished perimeter wall has been preserved, along with a row of shrubs leading to the church from the north.

== History ==
=== First church in Stanisławowo ===
The church in Stanisławowo (formerly the Alexandrian Colony) was built between 1844 and 1846 for the Russian Orthodox settlers brought from the Pskov Governorate. These settlers were invited by the Namiestnik of Poland, Ivan Paskevich, to villages neighboring the expanding Modlin Fortress (then Nowogeorgijewsk). Three Russian colonies were established at that time on lands acquired from Polish landowners or exchanged: Kosewka, Szczypiorna, and Aleksandryjska. Additionally, on parts of the Góra estate, which the Russian state acquired in 1839 through an exchange, the colony of Konstantynówka was established, while on government land the Zakroczymska colony was founded.

In total, 74 farmsteads were built in the colonies, suggesting the settlement of that many Orthodox peasant families. The long-time parson, Father Wasilij Torski, stated that the number of families was lower, around 60. The settlers came from the Pskov Governorate, and it was officially stated that they were all "natural Great Russians". However, Father Torski also mentioned that alongside the Russian language, they spoke Estonian (Chukhonian). This allows to infer that they may have belonged to the Setos people. Some of the inhabitants of Konstantynówka had previously lived in the Kingdom of Poland. These were Russian merchants, either Orthodox or Old Believers (who later joined the Russian Orthodox Church by 1869).

Initially, the Russian settlers were supposed to attend St. George's Cathedral within the Modlin Fortress, but they did not do so. Therefore, in 1840, during Tsar Nicholas I's visit to Warsaw, the Russian authorities decided to build a separate church, even without consulting the Orthodox Bishop of Warsaw, Antoni. The church building was designed by Jan Jakub Gay. The cornerstone for the construction was laid on 10 May 1844, and the completed church was dedicated on 29 August (or, according to another source, September) 1846 by Dean Teofil Nowicki of the Warsaw Deanery. The church was a brick, five-domed structure, and the total cost of its construction was 30,228 rubles. The church served around 400 parishioners, although this number fell to 354 by 1853. The church received a regular annual subsidy of 100 rubles from the Russian state treasury, in addition to the clergy's and psalmist's salaries. From 1849, a parish school operated near the church in the Alexandrian Colony.

By 1885, the number of churchgoers increased to 607, linked to the second Russian colonization in the Modlin area, organized by the authorities in 1875. By the end of the 19th century, around 1,100 people lived in the Russian colonies. In 1884, the church was visited by Tsar Alexander III. His visit, after meeting the emperors of Prussia and Austria in Skierniewice, was commemorated with a special plaque.

In 1900, the church was decorated with frescoes painted by iconographers from Chołuj. By 1907, the number of parishioners had grown to 1,305.

Before 1915, the church in Stanisławowo had been visited several times by the bishops of Warsaw, including Leoncjusz and Flawian, who had their summer residence in the Góra palace (formerly owned by the Poniatowski family).

=== Destruction of the first church in Stanisławowo and construction of a new one ===
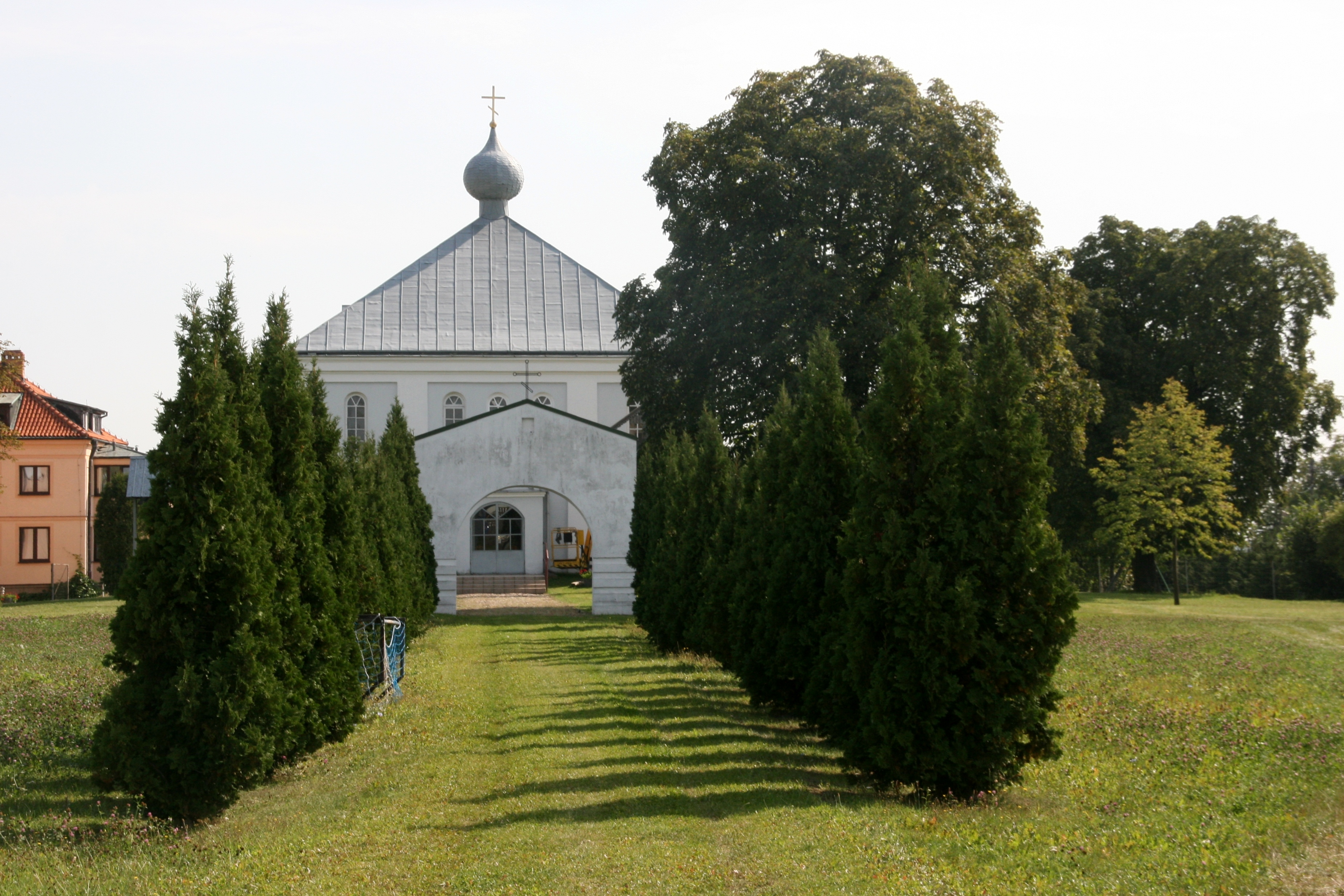
Church in Stanisławowo before renovation and the construction of side domes. A row of shrubs, formerly marking the path to the church, is visible

In 1915, the residents of the Russian colonies in Mazovia were evacuated deep into Russia, which led to the cessation of the local parish's activities. In August of the same year, during the German siege of the Modlin Fortress, the church was severely damaged due to artillery fire. Two shells hit the church: one damaged the bell tower and dome, while the other landed in the chancel but failed to explode.

During the interwar period, the church did not have the status of a parish church, despite efforts by the Polish Orthodox Church to obtain this status since 1922. The Ministry of Religious Affairs and Public Education considered recognizing it as a branch of the Cathedral of St. Mary Magdalene in Warsaw, but in the end, in 1927, they agreed only to open a chapel in the parish house without granting it parish status. Services in the church were conducted by a priest traveling from Warsaw.

The ruined building was demolished in 1935, with only the pillars retained, which were used in the construction of the new church. This new, smaller church was designed by Bogdan Lewandowski. Perhaps due to the unfavorable stance of the Polish authorities toward such investments, the new church had only one dome, unlike the five domes of the previous one. With the parish's consent, the new church was smaller than the previous one, and some of the construction material from the demolition of the old church was given for the construction of a school in Pomiechówek. According to Aleksander Sosna and Piotr Rajecki, the church was completed in 1938, although according to Andrzej Woźniak, its dedication took place four years earlier. At that time, approximately 500 people attended the church.

Items from the St. George Cathedral in Modlin were transferred to the new church. This cathedral had been demolished after World War I as part of the restitution of Orthodox sacred buildings.

=== During and after World War II ===
During World War II, the church in Stanisławowo suffered significant damage once again. It was hit by another shell, which pierced the front wall; the church doors were also destroyed, and the window frames were torn out. Shrapnel damaged the roof.

After 1945, the Orthodox population of Russian origin (largely already Polonized) was deported to the Soviet Union by the NKVD. As a result, the number of parishioners dropped to 120 (as recorded in the early 1950s). The parson, Teodor Rakiecki, left for the Soviet Union, and parishioners took some valuable church furnishings with them. In the following years, services at the church were conducted by clergy traveling from Warsaw. In the next decade, a significant group of worshippers still gathered for services, but due to migration to cities and mixed marriages, attendance eventually declined to the point where the church was closed. Another reason for the closure was its poor technical condition, although the parish still existed, and services were held in an adapted room in the rectory. The church underwent partial renovation in the 1960s.

In 1991, after the establishment of the Orthodox Care Home Betania next to the church, the building was renovated and reopened. At the beginning of the 21st century, the number of regular attendees was estimated at 35 people (9 families), in addition to Orthodox residents of the care home who participated in services. There were more Orthodox people of Russian origin in neighboring villages, but they did not attend services at the church.

The church was entered into the register of historical monuments on 12 April 1962 under number 1106/677/62.

In 1996, the Divine Liturgy was celebrated in the church by Metropolitan Bazyli of Warsaw and all Poland. In 2001, the church was visited by Patriarch Peter VII of Alexandria, accompanied by Metropolitan Sawa of Warsaw and all Poland and Archbishop Jeremiah of Wrocław and Szczecin. That same year, a renovation of the entire building began. The roof was replaced with zinc sheeting, the foundations were reinforced, and the facade was repainted. During the work, remnants of plaster and fresco fragments from the older church were discovered. The historic gate, built alongside the original church and once leading to its grounds, was also restored. In August 2014, crosses were blessed and placed atop the church domes. The renovation was completed in 2016. The dedication of the church took place on 15 May 2016, led by Metropolitan Sawa of Warsaw and all Poland, assisted by Bishop George of Siemiatycze and Archbishop Vladimir of Volodymyr-Volynskyi and Kovel (Ukrainian Orthodox Church). On the same day, relics of the Massacre of the Innocents were placed in the church altar.

The church in Stanisławowo is the only rural Orthodox church in the Mazovia region.

=== Myrrh-weeping icon ===
On 10 May 2017, during the Pentecost, an icon of the Resurrection of Christ, consecrated at the Church of the Holy Sepulchre and brought to Stanisławowo in 2016 along with the Holy Fire as a gift to the church, was discovered to be emitting fragrant oil. After confirming the phenomenon, a three-person commission led by Metropolitan Sawa introduced the daily reading of the Akathist in honor of the Resurrection of Christ before the icon.

== Architecture ==
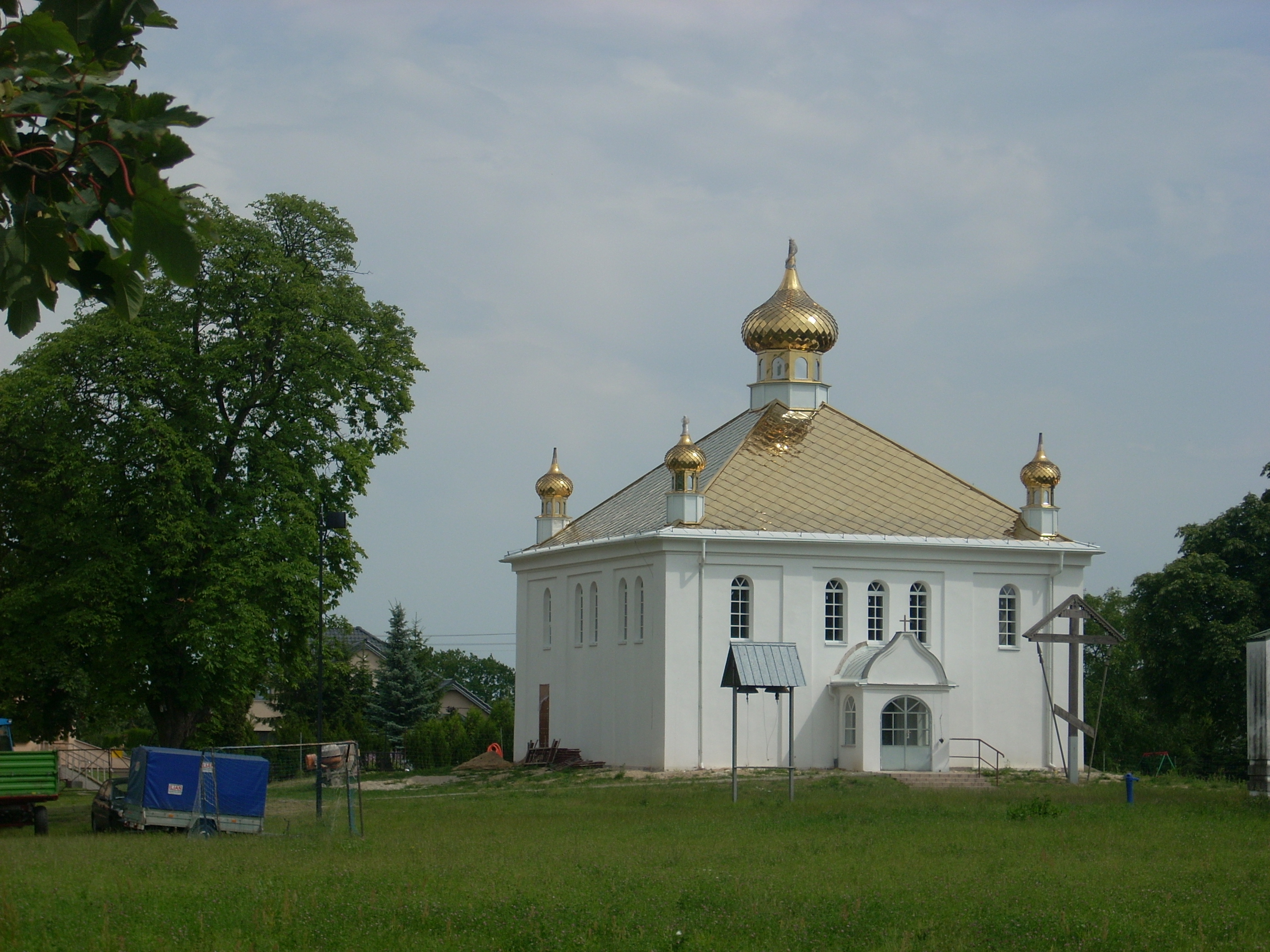
Church of St. Alexandra during the construction and gilding of new domes; directly in front of the church, a temporary bell tower and cross

The first church in Stanisławowo was built on a square plan, covering approximately 640 m². It was a five-domed, brick structure with plasterwork applied to create the appearance of a stone building. Its architecture featured Romanesque Revival elements, such as cornices, windows, and portals. The church bell tower was a separate, freestanding structure.

The second church is smaller than its predecessor. It was also built on a square plan, but with a side length of only 13 meters. Unlike the first church, this one does not have a bell tower, although architect Bogdan Lewandowski had originally included one in his design. The building initially featured only a single dome. However, in 2016, work on additional side domes was completed, partially restoring the church's former appearance.

=== Interior ===
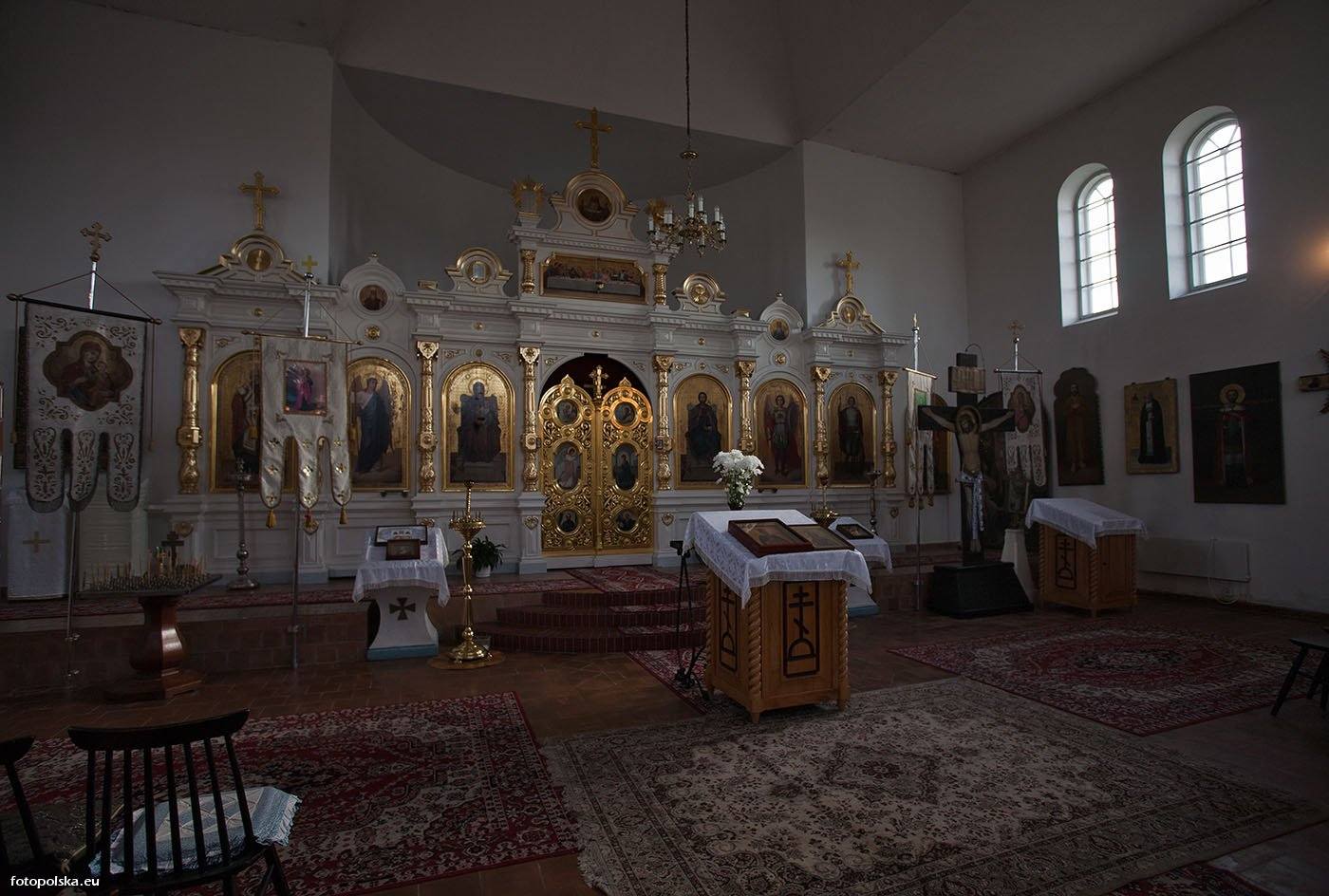
Interior of the church

The interior of the church features a single-tier iconostasis taken from the demolished cathedral in Modlin, which was originally created in the mid-19th century. From left to right, the iconostasis displays images of St. Nicholas, Archangel Gabriel, the Mother of God, Christ, Archangel Michael, and St. George the Victorious. Above the royal doors – traditionally adorned with the Annunciation scene and images of the Evangelists – an icon of the Last Supper is placed, with a smaller icon and a cross at the top. The original iconostasis contained additional icons in its lower tier, as the St. George Cathedral in Modlin was larger than the church in Stanisławowo. The fate of the original iconostasis from Stanisławowo's first church remains unknown.

The church also houses several 19th-century icons, including the Holy Trinity, a copy of the Smolensk Icon of the Mother of God, and the Suffering Mother of God icon, as well as a processional cross. The main patronal icon, depicting St. Alexandra of Rome, was created in the 21st century. Additionally, a smaller and older icon of the church's patron saint, originating from the first church in Stanisławowo, is preserved in the building. In 1993, an icon of Christ holding the Gospel was stolen from the church.

== Bibliography ==
- Woźniak, A. (2001). "Kartki z dziejów prawosławnej parafii św. Aleksandry w Stanisławowie koło Modlina" [Pages from the History of the Orthodox Parish of St. Alexandra in Stanisławowo near Modlin]. Etnografia Polska (in Polish). XLV. ISSN 0071-1861.
