= Battle of Czarnowo =

1806 Battle during the War of the Fourth Coalition

- Part of the War of the Fourth Coalition
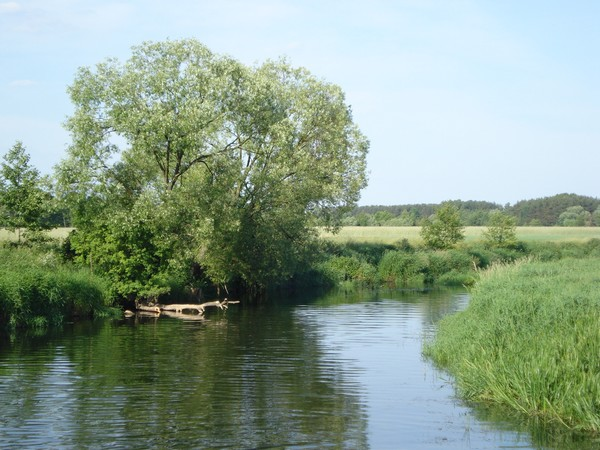
- The Russian army defended the line of the Wkra River.
Date	23 December 1806
Location	Czarnowo, Poland 52°28′31″N 20°46′23″E
Result	French victory

Belligerents
(France) French Empire	(Russia) Russian Empire; Kingdom of Prussia

Commanders and leaders
(France) Napoleon Bonaparte (France) Louis Davout (France) Jean Bessières (France) Pierre Augereau (France) Jean Marchand	(Russia) Mikhail Kamensky (Russia) A. Ostermann-Tolstoy (Russia) M. Barclay de Tolly (Kingdom of Prussia) Karl La Roche-Aymon (Kingdom of Prussia) Anton von L'Estocq

Strength
8,000–23,200; Bodart: 18,000; 20 guns	5,000–5,500; 48 guns

Casualties and losses
Czarnowo: 846–1,400; Bieżuń: light Kołoząb: 518; Soldau: 221	Czarnowo: 853–1,401; Bieżuń: 500, 5 guns Kołoząb: unknown, 6 guns Soldau: 800, 2 guns

War of the Fourth Coalition
⬤ current battle
⬤ Napoleon not in command
⬤ Napoleon in command

The Battle of Czarnowo on the night of 23–24 December 1806 saw troops of the First French Empire under the eye of Emperor Napoleon I launch an evening assault crossing of the Wkra River against Lieutenant General Alexander Ivanovich Ostermann-Tolstoy's defending Russian Empire forces. The attackers, part of Marshal Louis-Nicolas Davout's III Corps, succeeded in crossing the Wkra at its mouth and pressed eastward to the village of Czarnowo. After an all-night struggle, the Russian commander withdrew his troops to the east, ending this War of the Fourth Coalition action. Czarnowo is located on the north bank of the Narew River 33 kilometres (21 mi) north-northwest of Warsaw, Poland.

Several other actions occurred during the same week. On the 23rd, Marshal Jean-Baptiste Bessières defeated a probe by Prussian troops at Bieżuń. On 24 December, an action occurred at Kołoząb and Sochocin where Marshal Pierre Augereau's VII Corps attempted to cross the Wkra. The French managed to secure a foothold on the east bank, forcing Major General Michael Andreas Barclay de Tolly's Russian defenders to retreat. On Christmas Day, part of Marshal Michel Ney's VI Corps drove the Prussians from Soldau (Działdowo), forcing them to retreat north toward Königsberg. The Russians, however, were full of fight and two sharp battles occurred on 26 December.

== Background ==
At the Battle of Jena-Auerstedt on 14 October 1806, Napoleon administered a terrible beating to the principal Prussian armies. On a single day, the French captured 25,000 Prussian soldiers, 200 guns, and 60 colors. In subsequent operations the French inflicted crippling defeats on their adversaries at Erfurt, Halle, Prenzlau, Pasewalk, Stettin, Lübeck, Magdeburg, and Hamelin.

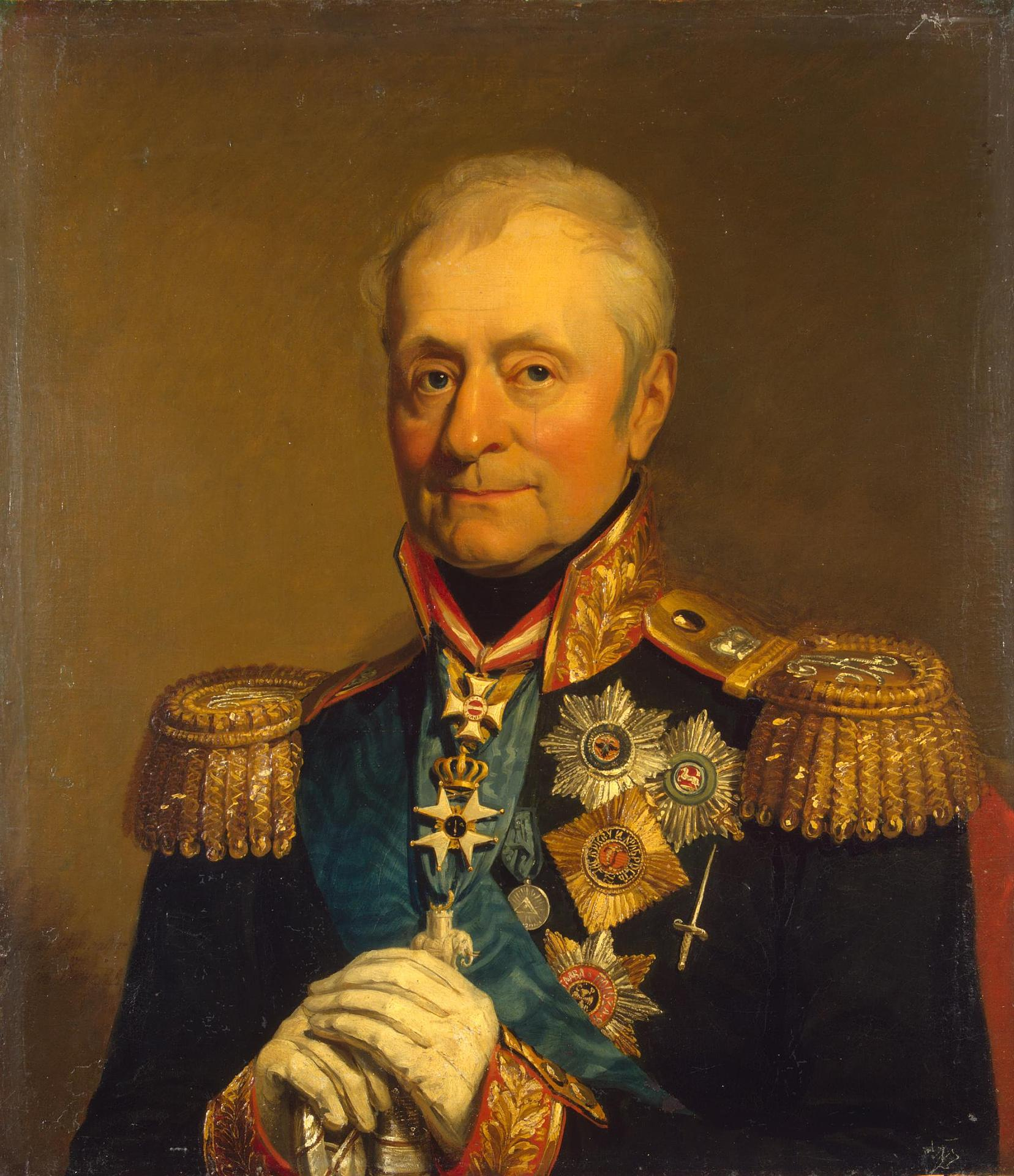
Levin August Bennigsen

In early November, Davout sent General of Division Marc Antoine de Beaumont's 2,500 dragoons to scout east of the Oder River. Napoleon ordered his brother General of Division Jérôme Bonaparte to protect his southern flank by operating against Glogau (Głogów) in Prussian-held Silesia. Wishing to deny Warsaw to the approaching Russian army, Napoleon decided to secure a position on the east bank of the Vistula River before winter weather forced a stop to the campaigning season.

In December, the Prussians were able to field only 6,000, plus the garrisons of Danzig (Gdańsk) and Graudenz (Grudziądz). Field Marshal Mikhail Kamensky led the Russian army in Poland, which numbered about 90,000 men in two wings led by Generals Levin August, Count von Bennigsen and Friedrich Wilhelm von Buxhoeveden (Buxhöwden). By now, Kamensky was showing clear signs of his mental and physical unfitness to command.

Buxhöwden, who outranked Bennigsen, led the 5th Division under Lieutenant General Nikolay Tuchkov; the 7th Division, commanded by Lieutenant General Dmitry Dokhturov; the 8th Division of Lieutenant General Peter Kirillovich Essen; and the 14th Division led by Lieutenant General Heinrich Reinhold von Anrep. Buxhöwden's divisions were veterans of the Battle of Austerlitz on 2 December 1805 and were under strength. In total, therefore, his wing had 29,000 infantry, 7,000 cavalry, 1,200 gunners, and 216 artillery pieces.

Bennigsen commanded the 2nd Division of Ostermann-Tolstoy, the 3rd Division led by Lieutenant General Fabian Gottlieb von Osten-Sacken, the 4th Division under Lieutenant General Dmitry Golitsyn, and the 6th Division commanded by Lieutenant General Alexander Karlovich Sedmoratski. The nominal strength of Bennigsen's force was 49,000 infantry, 11,000 regular cavalry, 4,000 Cossacks, 2,700 artillerymen, 900 pioneers, and 276 guns. Of these, between 55,000 and 60,000 were available for mobile operations.

The Russians fielded an army of 18 divisions in 1806. Each division consisted of six 3-battalion infantry regiments, ten squadrons of heavy cavalry, ten squadrons of light cavalry, two heavy foot artillery batteries, three light foot artillery batteries, and one horse artillery battery. With 14-gun foot batteries and 12-gun horse batteries, each Russian division theoretically controlled 82 field pieces. The heavy batteries were generally made up of eight 12-pound cannons, four heavy howitzers, and two light howitzers. The light batteries were similarly mustered but with 6-pound instead of 12-pound cannons. Horse batteries were exclusively made up of 6-pound cannons. Five divisions under General Johann Michelson faced the Ottoman Turks in Moldavia. The 1st Imperial Guard Division of Grand Duke Constantine Pavlovich of Russia was stationed at Saint Petersburg, while four additional divisions formed a reserve army in the interior.

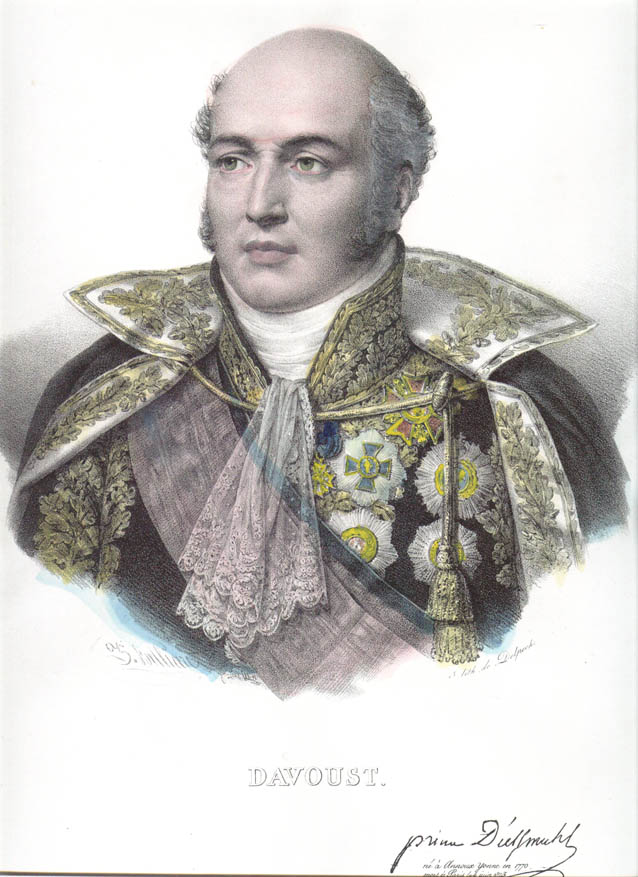
Louis-Nicolas Davout

Napoleon pressed forward with Davout, Augereau, Marshal Jean Lannes' V Corps, and Marshal Joachim Murat's Cavalry Reserve. As the French advanced, Bennigsen withdrew his troops from the Vistula. Murat occupied Warsaw on 28 November and Napoleon began turning the city into a center of operations. Buxhöwden's wing was still several marches to the rear and Bennigsen desired to join his colleague before facing the full strength of the French army. As the French crossed the Vistula in early December, Bennigsen had a change of heart and tried to retake his former position on the east bank. By now, Napoleon's second wave of corps was arriving and, after a few clashes, Bennigsen decided to pull back behind the Wkra after all.

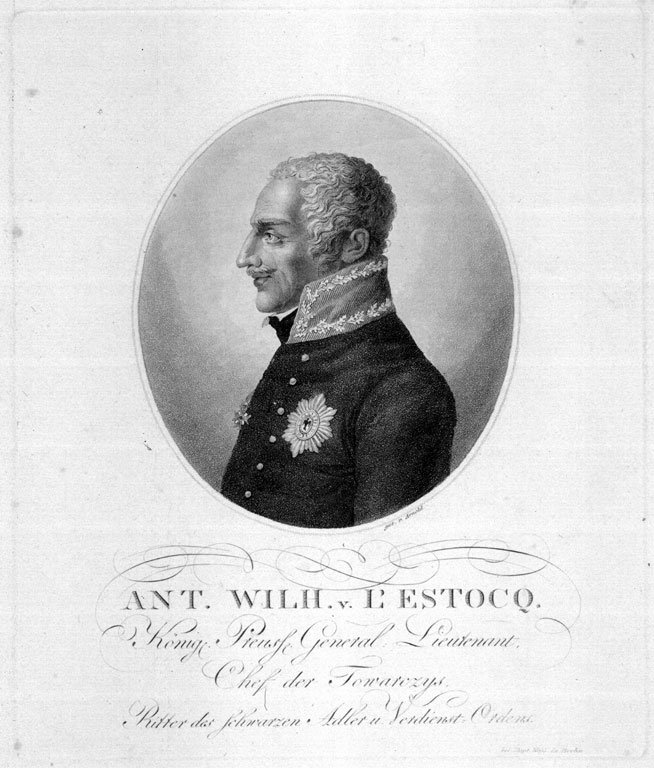
Anton von L'Estocq

After peaking during the whirlwind campaign west of the Oder, the morale of the French troops hit a new low point in Poland. The bad weather and approaching winter made Napoleon's troops very reluctant to continue the campaign. The Polish roads went from deep mud to frozen ruts as the weather grew colder. The emperor was forced to dispense a bonus in pay and extra shirts and shoes for his soldiers. Even so, French military discipline grew worse. At this time, Napoleon first used the term, les grognards (the grumblers), to describe his troops.

Napoleon determined to mount an offensive. Led by Murat's cavalry, Davout, Augereau, and Lannes would drive north from Warsaw. From Thorn (Toruń), Ney, Marshal Jean-Baptiste Bernadotte's I Corps, and Bessières would push east to turn the Russian right flank and separate General-Leutnant Anton Wilhelm von L'Estocq's Prussians from their allies. Marshal Nicolas Soult and the IV Corps would provide the connection between the two forces.

Two major cavalry formations were in existence. Murat's I Cavalry Corps included Beaumont's 3rd Dragoon Division, General of Division Étienne Marie Antoine Champion de Nansouty's 1st Cuirassier Division, General of Division Louis Klein's 1st Dragoon Division, General of Division Nicolas Léonard Beker's 5th Dragoon Division, and General of Brigade Édouard Jean Baptiste Milhaud's light cavalry brigade. Petre notes that the 5th Dragoon Division was with Savary at the time of Eylau. That would be Beker's unit. Bessières' short-lived II Cavalry Corps comprised the 2nd Dragoon Division under General of Division Emmanuel Grouchy, 4th Dragoon Division led by General of Division Louis Michel Antoine Sahuc, 2nd Cuirassier Division commanded by General of Division Jean-Joseph Ange d'Hautpoul, and the light cavalry division of General of Division Jacques Louis François Delaistre de Tilly. The II Cavalry Corps was established on 16 December and dissolved on 12 January 1807. Chandler lists the French cavalry division numbers.

== Battle ==
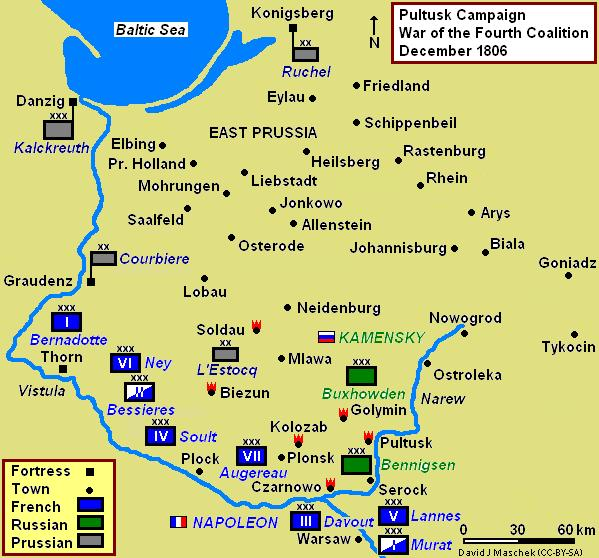
The Pultusk Campaign Map shows the positions of the opposing forces in late December 1806 as the French advanced. Actions occurred at Bieżuń and Czarnowo on the 23rd, Kołoząb on the 24th, Soldau on the 25th, and Pułtusk and Gołymin on the 26th.

On the morning of 23 December, Napoleon personally observed the Russian position near the point where the Wkra emptied into the Bug-Narew. Near its mouth, the Wkra split into two branches, forming a low, swampy island. Davout's troops had occupied the island since the night of 20 December. Davout had three infantry divisions under Generals of Division Charles Antoine Morand, Louis Friant, and Charles-Étienne Gudin de La Sablonnière. Napoleon decided on a night attack and drafted very detailed orders. Because of the high quality of Davout's generals and officers, the emperor's orders were carefully carried out.

Opposite the French, Ostermann-Tolstoy held the east bank of the Wkra with nine battalions, two squadrons, one regiment of Cossacks, 14 guns, and six light guns. The Russian 2nd Division included three infantry brigades. Major General Nikolai Mazovsky led the Pavlovski Grenadier and Rostov Musketeer Regiments, Major General Aleksandr Yakovlevich Sukin commanded the Petersburg Grenadier and Jeletzsky Musketeer Regiments, and Major General Ivan Andreievich Lieven directed the 1st and 20th Jager Regiments. The complement of 48 guns was made up of two 12-pound foot batteries and two 6-pound horse batteries. Smith gives the full 18-battalion strength, but lists no cavalry units. Major General Peter Petrovich Pahlen led the cavalry brigade which included the Little Russia Cuirassier, Courland Dragoon, and Soum Hussar Regiments, plus the Malakov and Sissoiev Cossacks. This source gives the cavalry organization and the full names of the infantry brigade commanders.

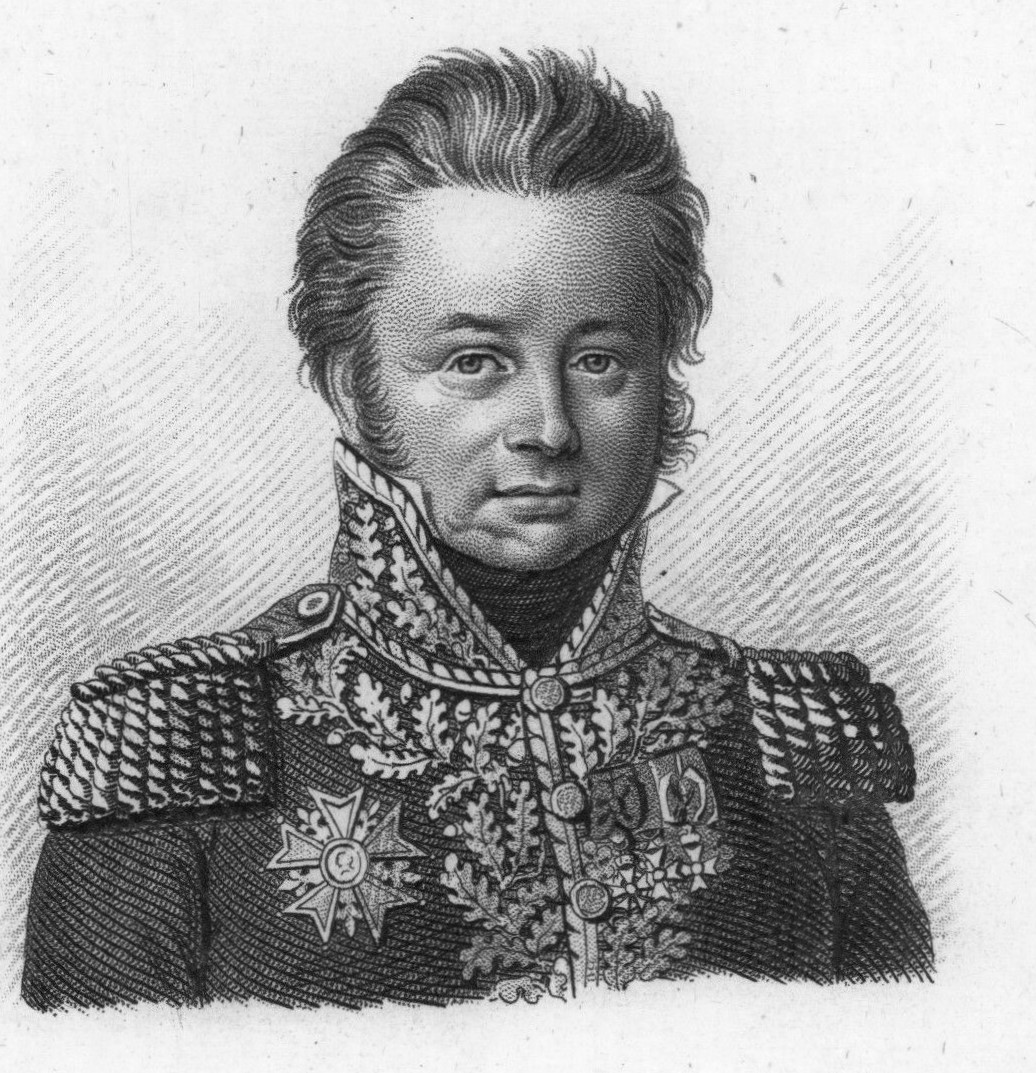
Charles Antoine Morand

Morand's division assembled on the island, Friant's troops were slightly farther north at the village of Pomiechowo, and Gudin's soldiers held a bridgehead to the west near Modlin. At 7:00 PM Morand deployed his troops into three columns, each headed by one battalion. Supported by artillery firing canister and well deployed smoke screens, the French voltigeur (light) companies were ferried across the Wkra by Guard Sailors. The voltigeurs took covering positions on the east bank while pontonniers of both the engineer corps and Sailors of the Guard quickly built three bridges. Once the bridges were completed, Morand's troops swarmed across. The 17th Light Infantry Regiment and three squadrons of cavalry were among the first units across. General of Brigade Claude Petit led a task force from Gudin's division across the bridge nearest the Bug-Narew and moved up the Wkra's east bank. Morand's attack was a success and the Russians were quickly hustled out of their positions on the east bank.

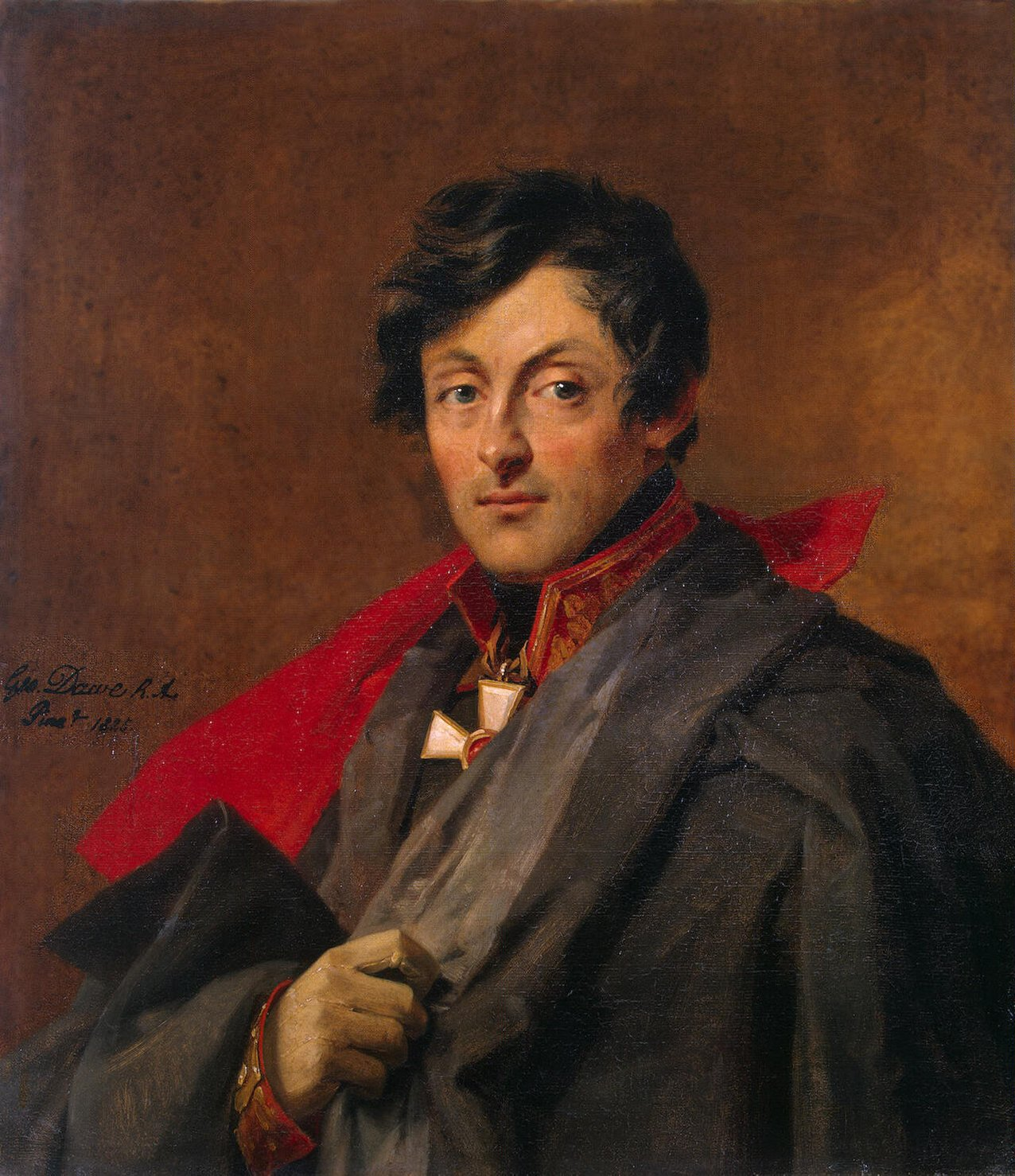
A. Ostermann-Tolstoy

The 17th Light rushed forward and drove the Russians out of Czarnowo. However, their opponents soon rallied and recaptured the village from the French. There was a lull in the action as Morand brought reinforcements up. He sent forward the 30th Line Infantry Regiment, one battalion along the banks of the Bug-Narew to attack on the right, a second battalion in a frontal attack, while the third battalion moved through a pine woods on the left. Ostermann-Tolstoy's troops also repelled this assault. Afraid of losing his heavy artillery, the Russian commander sent his to the rear. The French continued their attack and eventually seized Czarnowo, then deployed east of the village.

Meanwhile, with the help of six guns on the west bank of the Wkra, Petit's 400 men cleared the Russian redoubts opposite Pomiechowo. They were first charged by Russian cavalry, which they drove off. Davout sent some of Gudin's troops to assist and Petit hung onto the redoubts, despite being attacked by Russian infantry. At 4:00 AM, Ostermann-Tolstoy issued orders for retreat while maintaining his attacks on Petit. With the help of three late-arriving Russian battalions and four squadrons, the Russians withdrew in good order to the east.

Friant's troops were ordered forward at 4:00 AM. Arriving on the field soon after, they took over the pursuit from Morand's exhausted men. Together with Davout's light cavalry under General of Brigade Jacob François Marulaz and a dragoon regiment, Friant's soldiers hounded the Russian retreat. The French captured three enemy guns at Nasielsk and drove their opponents into some nearby woods. The Russians fought back hard, keeping Davout's troops from advancing farther than Nasielsk that day.

Ostermann-Tolstoy admitted losing 500 men, but a work by Alexander Mikhailovsky-Danilevsky stated that 853 Russians were killed and wounded, including three generals wounded. Davout reported losing 807 casualties. The French suffered particularly heavy losses in officers. Historian David G. Chandler estimated losses as 1,400 on both sides. Digby Smith asserted that French casualties were 16 officers and 830 men, while the Russians suffered 41 officers and 1,360 men casualties and five guns captured. Smith's total included 500 prisoners.

== Bieżuń, Kołoząb, and Soldau actions ==
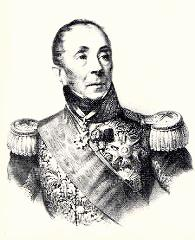
Emmanuel Grouchy

On 19 December Bessières advance guard, which consisted of Grouchy's dragoons, seized Bieżuń. Anxious to regain control of the town, L'Estocq sent two infantry regiments, a regiment of dragoons, two regiments of hussars, and horse artillery battery to recapture it. This force arrived at Bieżuń on the 23rd to find that Grouchy had been heavily reinforced by Bessières' II Cavalry Corps, plus infantry and artillery. Leading his division, Grouchy attacked the Prussians and drove them back toward Soldau. The 2nd Dragoon Division included the 3rd, 4th, 10th, 11th, 13th, and 22nd Dragoon Regiments plus three horse artillery pieces. Major Karl Anton Stephan de La Roche-Aymon led the Prussian units bearing the brunt of this action, which were half of the Towarcys Uhlan Regiment, the Schleiffen Grenadier Battalion, and a horse artillery battery. Trapped against a swampy forest, 500 of the Prussian infantry and five guns were captured. French losses were described as light, while the number of Prussians killed and wounded was not reported.

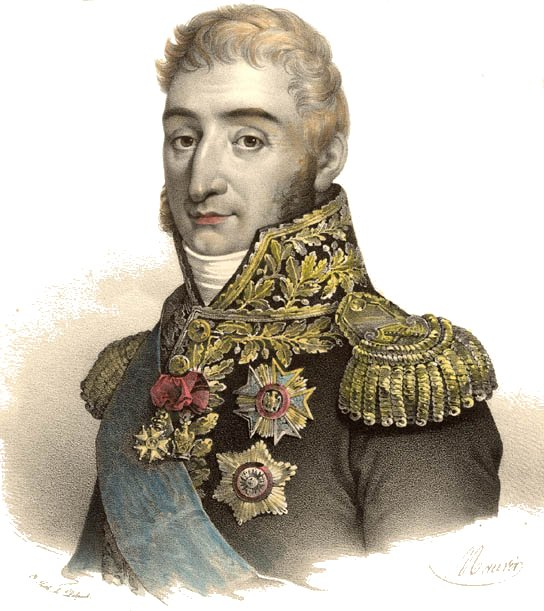
Pierre Augereau

As the main action at Czarnowo faded away at dawn on 24 December, Augereau attempted to force a passage of the Wkra to the northwest. Kołoząb is about 10 kilometres (6.2 mi) northeast of Plonsk while Sochocin is 5 kilometres (3.1 mi) northwest of Kołoząb. (Note: Google Earth was used to measure distances and directions.) The VII Corps commander had two infantry divisions and two cavalry brigades on hand. Augereau ordered Jacques Desjardin's 1st Infantry Division and Milhaud's cavalry to seize the crossing at Kołoząb, while sending Étienne Heudelet de Bierre's 2nd Division and General of Brigade Pierre Watier's cavalry to take Sochocin.

The Russian commander, Barclay de Tolly, deployed three battalions and three squadrons at Sochocin, three battalions and two squadrons at Kołoząb, and three battalions to hold the wooded area between the two villages. The bridges at both places were burnt and the Kołoząb crossing was defended by 12 artillery pieces. Heudelet's attack failed when his soldiers were unable to rebuild the bridge under heavy fire. Frustrated at the failure of his first attempt, he ordered a second attack which resulted in further losses.

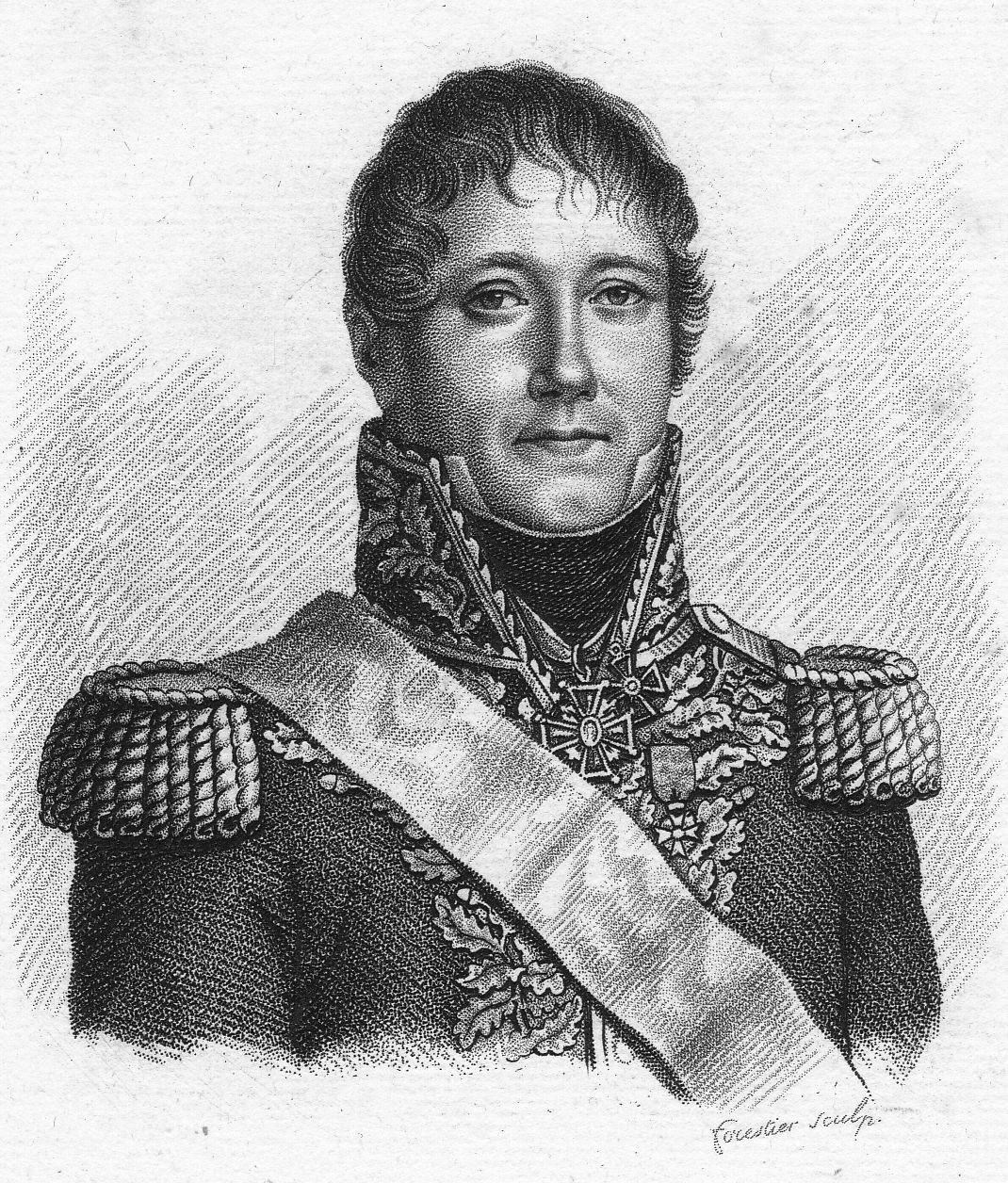
Jean Gabriel Marchand

Desjardin's assault enjoyed better luck. He spread the 16th Light Infantry Regiment along the west bank opposite Kołoząb. Under the 16th's covering fire, the grenadiers of the 2nd Battalion of the 14th Line Infantry Regiment picked their way across the incompletely destroyed bridge to seize a foothold on the east bank. Though counterattacked by Russian infantry and hussars, the grenadiers held on until reinforced. The French forced back their opponents and captured six guns. Meanwhile, General of Brigade Pierre Belon Lapisse took a task force 3 kilometres (1.9 mi) downstream (south), surprised the bridge guard at Pruszkowo, and successfully crossed. After this success, Augereau marched Heudelet's division to the Kołoząb crossing. Milhaud aggressively pursued the Russians and captured the baggage train of the 2nd Division. Augereau reported losses of 66 killed and 452 wounded, almost equally divided between his two divisions. Russian losses are not reported.

Also on the 24th, Ney bumped into a Prussian rear guard under Oberstleutnant Friedrich Wilhelm Freiherr von Bülow at Górzno and pushed it back. Bülow joined La Roche-Aymon's detachment and the two continued falling back. Ney sent General of Division Jean Gabriel Marchand's division ahead toward Soldau and Mława while holding the other division at Górzno. On 25 December, Marchand with two regiments attacked the single Prussian battalion at Soldau and drove it out of the town at 2:00 PM. The rest of his division, which had taken a roundabout path through Mława soon arrived. L'Estocq attacked Soldau at about 5:00 PM, but was unable to break into the town despite hand-to-hand fighting. He retreated north to Neidenberg (Nidzica), breaking contact with the Russian army.

Marchand commanded the 27th, 39th, 69th, and 76th Line Infantry Regiments, eight battalions, and 12 guns in two foot artillery batteries. Out of a total of 6,000 troops, the French suffered 220 casualties, including General of Brigade François Pierre Felix Vonderweidt. L'Estocq's troops, which belonged to General-Major Christoph Friedrich Otto Diericke's brigade, included 3,000 men in four battalions and eight 12-pound guns. The units involved were the Rüchel Infantry Regiment # 2 and the Schöning Infantry Regiment # 11. Prussian casualties were not reported, though Ney claimed to have inflicted 800 casualties on his enemies and captured two guns and one color. Smith states that Vonderweidt was killed. This source asserts that Vonderweidt died in 1810.

The French pressed eastward and encountered the Russians in two major actions on 26 December. At the Battle of Pułtusk, Bennigsen with 40,600 troops fought 26,000 French under Marshal Lannes. Golitsyn and 9,000 Russians fought off Augereau's 16,000 French at the Battle of Gołymin.

== Notes ==
Preceded by Siege of Hamelin	Napoleonic Wars; Battle of Czarnowo	Succeeded by Battle of Golymin
