= Pomiechówek railway station =

Railway station in Pomiechówek, Poland

Pomiechówek
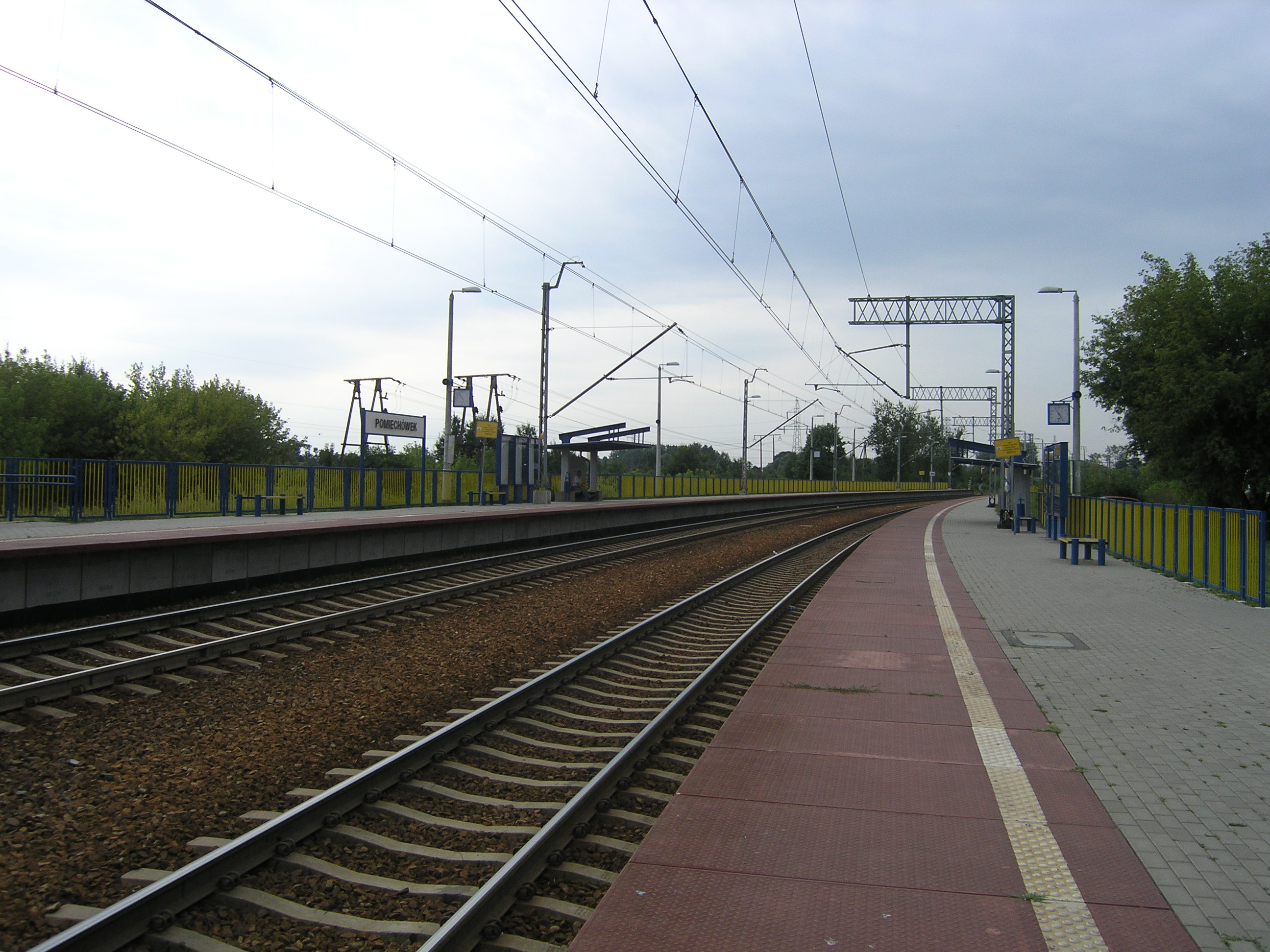

General information
- Location: Pomiechówek, Pomiechówek, Nowy Dwór, Masovian; Poland
- Coordinates: 52°28′28″N 20°44′41″E
- System: Rail Station
- Owner: PKP Polskie Linie Kolejowe

Services
Preceding station	Masovian Railways	Following station
Modlin towards Warszawa Zachodnia	R9	Brody Warszawskie towards Działdowo
Modlin towards Warszawa Zachodnia	R90	Brody Warszawskie towards Działdowo
Modlin towards Warszawa Zachodnia	RE9	Nasielsk towards Działdowo
Modlin towards Warszawa Zachodnia	RE90	Nasielsk towards Działdowo
Location

Pomiechówek railway station is a railway station in Pomiechówek, Nowy Dwór, Masovian, Poland. It is served by Masovian Railways.
