= Wójtostwo =

Wójtostwo may refer to the following places:

- Wójtostwo, Pajęczno County in Łódź Voivodeship (central Poland)
- Wójtostwo, Piotrków County in Łódź Voivodeship (central Poland)
- Wójtostwo, Kozienice County in Masovian Voivodeship (east-central Poland)
- Wójtostwo, Gmina Pomiechówek, Nowy Dwór County in Masovian Voivodeship (east-central Poland)
- Wójtostwo, Greater Poland Voivodeship (west-central Poland)
