= Brody Warszawskie railway station =

Railway station in Pomiechówek, Poland

Brody Warszawskie
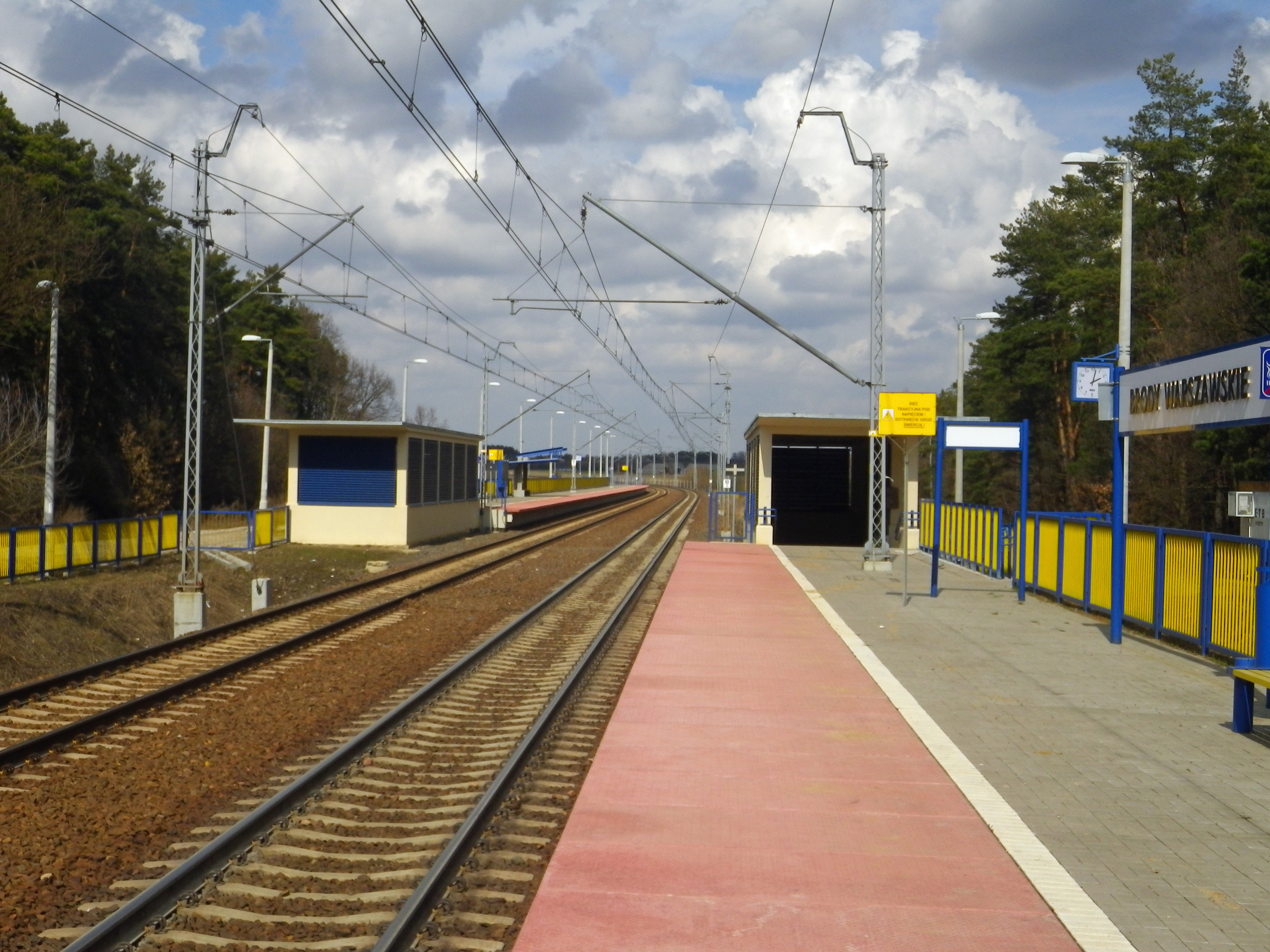

General information
- Location: Goławice Pierwsze, Masovian Voivodeship; Poland
- Coordinates: 52°30′50″N 20°44′55″E
- Owner: Polish State Railways

Services
Preceding station	Masovian Railways	Following station
Pomiechówek towards Warszawa Zachodnia	R9	Studzianki Nowe towards Działdowo
Pomiechówek towards Warszawa Zachodnia	R90	Studzianki Nowe towards Działdowo
Location

Brody Warszawskie is a railway station in Goławice Pierwsze, Nowy Dwór County, Masovian Voivodeship, in central Poland. It is served by Masovian Railways.
