= Czarnowo, Gmina Pomiechówek =

Czarnowo
- Village
- Location within Poland
- Coordinates: 52°28′31″N 20°46′23″E
- Country: Poland
- Voivodeship: Masovian
- County: Nowy Dwór
- Gmina: Pomiechówek

Czarnowo [t͡ʂarˈnɔvɔ] is a village in the administrative district of Gmina Pomiechówek, within Nowy Dwór County, Masovian Voivodeship, in east-central Poland. The village is on the north bank of the Narew River, a short distance east of the point where the Wkra River flows into it from the north.

== History ==
The Battle of Czarnowo was fought on 23–24 December 1806 during the War of the Fourth Coalition, part of the Napoleonic Wars. French soldiers under the command of Marshal Louis-Nicolas Davout forced a crossing of the Wkra near Pomiechowo. When they advanced eastward to Czarnowo they were fiercely resisted by Russian troops led by Lieutenant General Alexander Ivanovich Ostermann-Tolstoy in an all-night contest. In the early morning hours of the 24th, Ostermann-Tolstoy ordered a retreat. The fighting caused about 1,400 casualties on each side.
