= Alexander Chappuzeau =

Russian Navy officer

Alexander Chappuzeau (Russian: Александр Шапиза or Шапизо) was a naval officer in the Russian Fleet. He was the eldest son of Jacob Chappuzeau.

Alexander Chappuzeau was aide-de-camp to the famous Count Jean Armand de L'Estocq around 1743 to 1748.

In 1772, his daughter Anna married botanist Samuel Gottlieb Gmelin (1744–1774). After his death, she married Peter Possiet de Roussier, and their descendants are found in the Stael von Holstein family.
