= Anton Wilhelm von L'Estocq =

German general (1738–1815)

Anton von L’Estocq
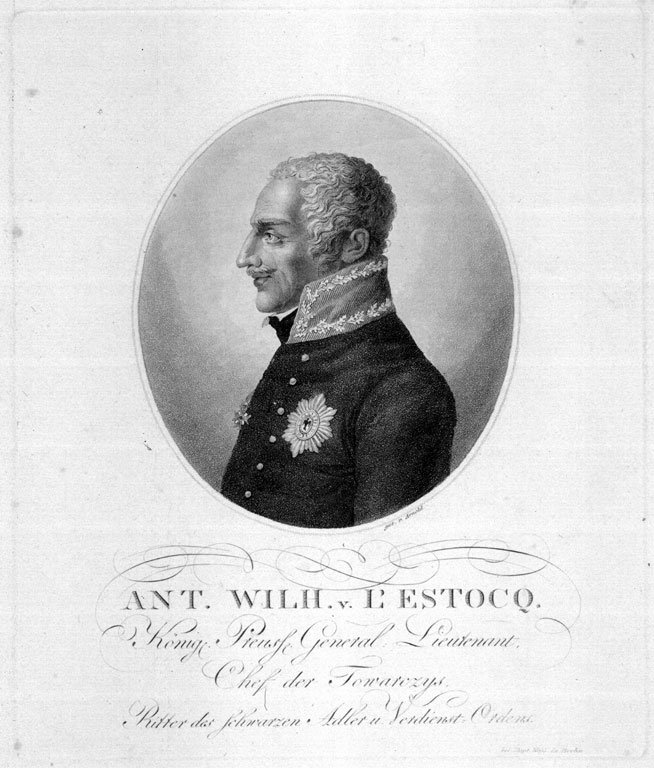
- "The Prussian cavalry general Anton Wilhelm von L’Estocq"
- Born: Anton Wilhelm von L'Estocq; 16 August 1738; Celle, Electorate of Hanover
- Died: 5 January 1815 (aged 76); Berlin, Kingdom of Prussia
- Military career
- Allegiance: Prussia
- Branch: Prussian Army
- Service years: 1757–1815
- Rank: Generalleutnant
- Conflicts: Seven Years' War; Third Silesian War; Battle of Zorndorf; Battle of Kunersdorf; Battle of Torgau; French Revolutionary Wars; Napoleonic Wars; War of the First Coalition; Battle of Kaiserslautern; Battle of Trippstadt; War of the Fourth Coalition; Battle of Eylau; Battle of Friedland
- Awards: Pour le Mérite; Order of the Black Eagle

Anton Wilhelm von L'Estocq (16 August 1738 – 5 January 1815) was a Prussian cavalry general best known for his command of the Prussian troops at the Battle of Eylau.

== Biography ==
L'Estocq was born in Celle, Electorate of Hanover, the son of a Huguenot Prussian officer. In 1757 he became a cadet officer of the Gensd'armes regiment of Berlin. During the Seven Years' War, he participated in the battles of Zorndorf, Kunersdorf, and Torgau. After a battle near Langensalza, he received the Pour le Mérite.

In 1768 L'Estocq became first lieutenant and served in the hussar regiment of General Hans Joachim von Zieten. Initially Zieten's adjutant, he was promoted successively to cavalry captain, major, lieutenant colonel, and colonel. In 1779, L'Estocq was stationed near Fehrbellin, where he assisted General Zieten with the regimental business in that area. In 1790 King Frederick William II of Prussia named L'Estocq battalion commander of the Regiment von Eben (2nd Hussar Regiment).

During the First Coalition against revolutionary France, L'Estocq participated in the battles of Kaiserslautern, Morsbrunn, and Trippstadt. In 1794 he took command of the 2nd Hussar Regiment, which was stationed in Westphalia to guard the border with France after the 1795 Peace of Basel.

== Major-general ==
Promoted to major-general, L'Estocq was stationed in New East Prussia in 1803, commanding all troops in the province as head of the 9th Hussar Regiment. In 1805 he was promoted to lieutenant-general.

During the War of the Fourth Coalition, L'Estocq and his chief of staff, Gerhard von Scharnhorst, commanded some 15,000 troops based at Thorn in December 1806 and at Freystadt in January 1807. Harassed by Marshal Ney, L'Estocq marched his troops from February 2 – February 8 through snowy and forested East Prussia; it has been described as "a model of the way in which a flank march in the face of a near and powerful adversary should be conducted".

The Russian troops of Bennigsen were hard-pressed by Marshal Davout in the Battle of Eylau (February 7-February 8, 1807). Leading the last operational unit in the Prussian army, L'Estocq was only able to bring eight battalions, twenty-eight squadrons, and two horse artillery batteries (estimated at 7,000-9,000 men) to the battle; the rest of his soldiers were defending against Ney. Upon the small Prussian contingent's arrival at Preußisch Eylau, Bennigsen wanted it split up to reinforce his weakened Russian troops. Scharnhorst, however, advised L'Estocq to strike with his cavalry around the Russian lines at Davout's exhausted troops; the sudden attack threw the French into disarray. Following the battle, L'Estocq's corps retreated to Preußisch Friedland to maintain coalition communications with Russia.

== Honours ==
For their leadership in the battle, L'Estocq received the Order of the Black Eagle and Scharnhorst the Pour le Mérite. While the Prussian Army had been crushed at Jena-Auerstedt, L'Estocq's troops restored honor to the demoralized military. Colmar Freiherr von der Goltz wrote, "it was at Eylau in 1807, and not the War of Liberation in 1813, that the old army vindicated itself before the tribunal of history". Von der Goltz attributed the success to Scharnhorst's planning and L'Estocq's initiative and willingness to attack.

After the coalition defeat in the Battle of Friedland and the humiliating Treaties of Tilsit, L'Estocq was part of an investigatory commission into the causes of Prussia's defeat in the Fourth Coalition. Because of his successful cooperation with L'Estocq, Scharnhorst successfully lobbied for attaching a chief of staff to each field commander in 1813.

L'Estocq became Governor of Berlin on 12 November 1808, and of Breslau in 1814. After his death in Berlin on 5 January 1815, L'Estocq was buried in the cemetery of the city's garrison church three days later.

== See also ==
- Jean Armand de L'Estocq (1692–1767)
- Johann Ludwig von L’Estocq (1712–1779) here the link to Johann Ludwig, b. 1712, redirects (https://en.wikipedia.org/w/index.php?title=Johann_Ludwig_von_L%E2%80%99Estocq&redirect=no) to Jean Armand. According to the latter's Wikipedia page, "Johann Ludwig von L'Estocq married in 1720 Helene Clara Chappuzeau (1690–1768), the daughter of Laurent Chappuzeau and only sister of Jacob Chappuzeau; they had one child, Karl Ludwig (1725–1806), and divorced in 1726." It says nothing however about whether Johann Ludwig had a child from a later relation.
