= Błędowo =

Błędowo may refer to the following places:

- Błędowo, Wąbrzeźno County in Kuyavian-Pomeranian Voivodeship (north-central Poland)
- Błędowo, Włocławek County in Kuyavian-Pomeranian Voivodeship (central Poland)
- Błędowo, Gmina Pomiechówek, Nowy Dwór County in Masovian Voivodeship (east-central Poland)
- Błędowo, Ostrołęka County in Masovian Voivodeship (east-central Poland)
- Błędowo, Warmian-Masurian Voivodeship (north Poland)
