= Wymysły =

Wymysły may refer to the following places:

- Wymysły, Maków County in Masovian Voivodeship (east-central Poland)
- Wymysły, Gmina Pomiechówek, Nowy Dwór County in Masovian Voivodeship (east-central Poland)
- Wymysły, Sokołów County in Masovian Voivodeship (east-central Poland)
- Wymysły, Warmian-Masurian Voivodeship (north Poland)
