= Bronisławka, Gmina Pomiechówek =

Bronisławka
- Village
- Location within Poland
- Coordinates: 52°27′16″N 20°43′5″E
- Country: Poland
- Voivodeship: Masovian
- County: Nowy Dwór
- Gmina: Pomiechówek
- Population: 190

Bronisławka [brɔniˈswafka] is a village in the administrative district of Gmina Pomiechówek, within Nowy Dwór County, Masovian Voivodeship, in east-central Poland.
