= Brody-Parcele =

- Village
- Location within Poland
- Coordinates: 52°29′N 20°45′E
- Country: Poland
- Voivodeship: Masovian
- County: Nowy Dwór
- Gmina: Pomiechówek
- Population: 1,600

Brody-Parcele [ˈbrɔdɨ parˈt͡sɛlɛ] is a village in Nowy Dwór County, Masovian Voivodeship, in east-central Poland. It is the seat of the gmina (administrative district) called Gmina Pomiechówek.
