= Studzianki Nowe railway station =

Railway station in Masovian Voivodeship, Poland

Studzianki Nowe
- Station in March 2019

General information
- Location: Studzianki, Nowy Dwór County, Masovian Voivodeship; Poland
- Coordinates: 52°32′15″N 20°45′07″E
- Owner: Polish State Railways
- Line: Warsaw–Gdańsk

Services
Preceding station	Masovian Railways	Following station
Brody Warszawskie towards Warszawa Zachodnia	R9	Nasielsk towards Działdowo
Brody Warszawskie towards Warszawa Zachodnia	R90	Nasielsk towards Działdowo
Location
- Location within Poland

Studzianki Nowe is a railway station in Studzianki, Nasielsk, Nowy Dwór County, within the Masovian Voivodeship in central Poland. It is served by Masovian Railways.

== History ==
The station opened on 28 May 1972 as Studzianki. It was renamed to Studzianki Nowe in 1974.
