= Samuel Gottlieb Gmelin =

German physician and botanist (1744–1774)

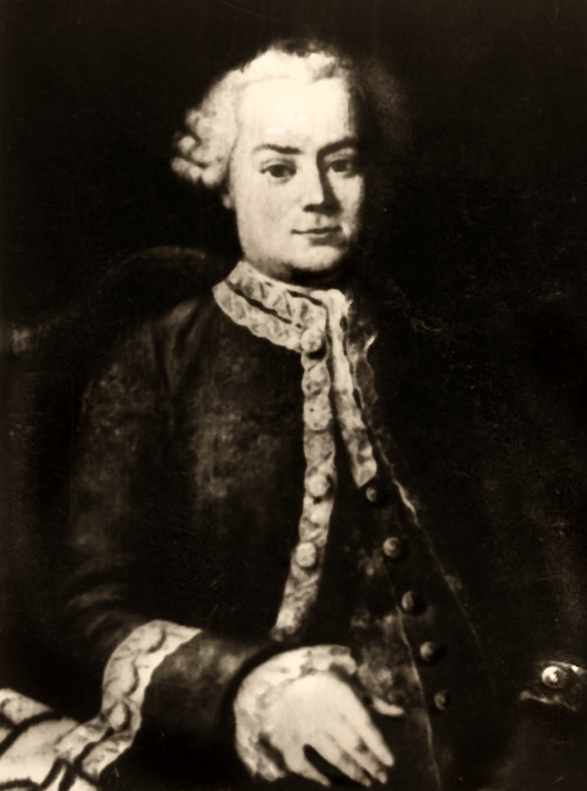
- Born: 4 July 1744; Tübingen, Kingdom of Württemberg, Holy Roman Empire
- Died: 27 July 1774 (aged 30); Akhmedkent, Shamkhalate of Tarki, Russian Empire
- Education: University of Leiden
- Known for: Exploring the rivers Don and Volga, and coasts of the Caspian Sea; Reise durch Russland zur untersuchung der drey natur-reiche
- Spouse(s): Anna von Chappuzeau, granddaughter of Jacob Chappuzeau
- Relatives: Johann Georg Gmelin (uncle); Johann Friedrich Gmelin (cousin)
- Scientific career
- Fields: Botany
- Institutions: University of St. Petersburg
- Author abbrev. (botany): S.G.Gmel.

Samuel George Gottlieb Gmelin (4 July 1744 – 27 July 1774) was a German physician, botanist, and explorer.

== Background ==
Gmelin was born at Tübingen as part of a well-known family of naturalists. His father was Johann Conrad Gmelin, an apothecary and surgeon. His uncle was Johann Georg Gmelin, who was also uncle to Johann Friedrich Gmelin (the naturalist publisher of the Systema Naturae of Carolus Linnaeus). Samuel earned his medical degree in 1763 from the University of Leiden at the young age of 18. While living in the Dutch Republic, Gmelin developed a keen interest in marine algae. In 1766 he was appointed professor of botany at St Petersburg. In the following year he was sent on an expedition to study the natural history of the Russian Empire. He explored the rivers Don and Volga, and the western and eastern coasts of the Caspian Sea. Whilst travelling in the Caucasus he was taken hostage by Usmey Khan of Khaïtakes and died of ill treatment in captivity in Akhmedkent, Dagestan. He was only 30 years of age. His death led to a Russian punitive expedition which briefly conquered Derbent.

Gmelin was the author of Historia Fucorum (1768), the first work dedicated to marine biology dealing exclusively with algae and the first using the binomial system of nomenclature. It includes elaborate illustrations of seaweed and marine algae on folded leaves. However, algal specimens used by Gmelin in the Historia fucorum are thought to no longer exist (Dixon & Irvine, 1970). The results of his travels were published in Reise durch Russland zur untersuchung der drey natur-reiche ("Trip Through Russia To Study the Three Natural Provinces") (1770–1784, 4 vols.). The final volume was to be completed by Güldenstädt, but was ultimately edited by Peter Simon Pallas after Güldenstädt's death.

== Biography ==
In 1772, he married Anna von Chappuzeau, granddaughter of the famous naval captain Jacob Chappuzeau (Iakov Shapizo), hero of the battle of Osel Island in 1719, when he commanded the Raphail.
