= Błędówko =

- Village
- Location within Poland
- Coordinates: 52°31′N 20°40′E
- Country: Poland
- Voivodeship: Masovian
- County: Nowy Dwór County, Masovian VoivodeshipNowy Dwór
- Gmina: Pomiechówek

Błędówko [bwɛnˈdufkɔ] is a village in the administrative district of Gmina Pomiechówek, within Nowy Dwór County, Masovian Voivodeship, in east-central Poland.
