= David le Boiteux =

David le Boiteux (c.1550–1612) was Recteur or Principal of the Acadèmie de Calvin in Geneva from 1592 to 1595, Pasteur in Russin from 1577 and in Geneva from 1585, secretary to Théodore de Bèze from 1584, secretary to the Compagnie des pasteurs de Genève between 1592 and 1598, and Head librarian of the Library of Geneva between 1598 and 1612.

== Family ==
His origins are not known, but he was the son of a Frenchman, Quintin (or Quintius) le Boiteux (died 1552), professor at the University of Lausanne from 1549. He had four daughters and one son, Isaac, who died in the same year as his father. Samuel Chappuzeau stated to the council when applying for citizenship of Geneva in 1663 that Le Sieur Boiteux, i.e. David, was the great-(great-)grandfather of his children (from his first marriage).

== Sources ==
- Registres de la Compagnie des pasteurs de Genève, Librairie Droz, 1991
