= Szczypiorno, Masovian Voivodeship =

Szczypiorno
- Village
- Location within Poland
- Coordinates: 52°29′55″N 20°40′9″E
- Country: Poland
- Voivodeship: Masovian
- County: Nowy Dwór
- Gmina: Pomiechówek

Szczypiorno [ʂt͡ʂɨˈpjɔrnɔ] is a village in the administrative district of Gmina Pomiechówek, within Nowy Dwór County, Masovian Voivodeship, in east-central Poland.
