= Le Théâtre François =

Book by Samuel Chappuzeau

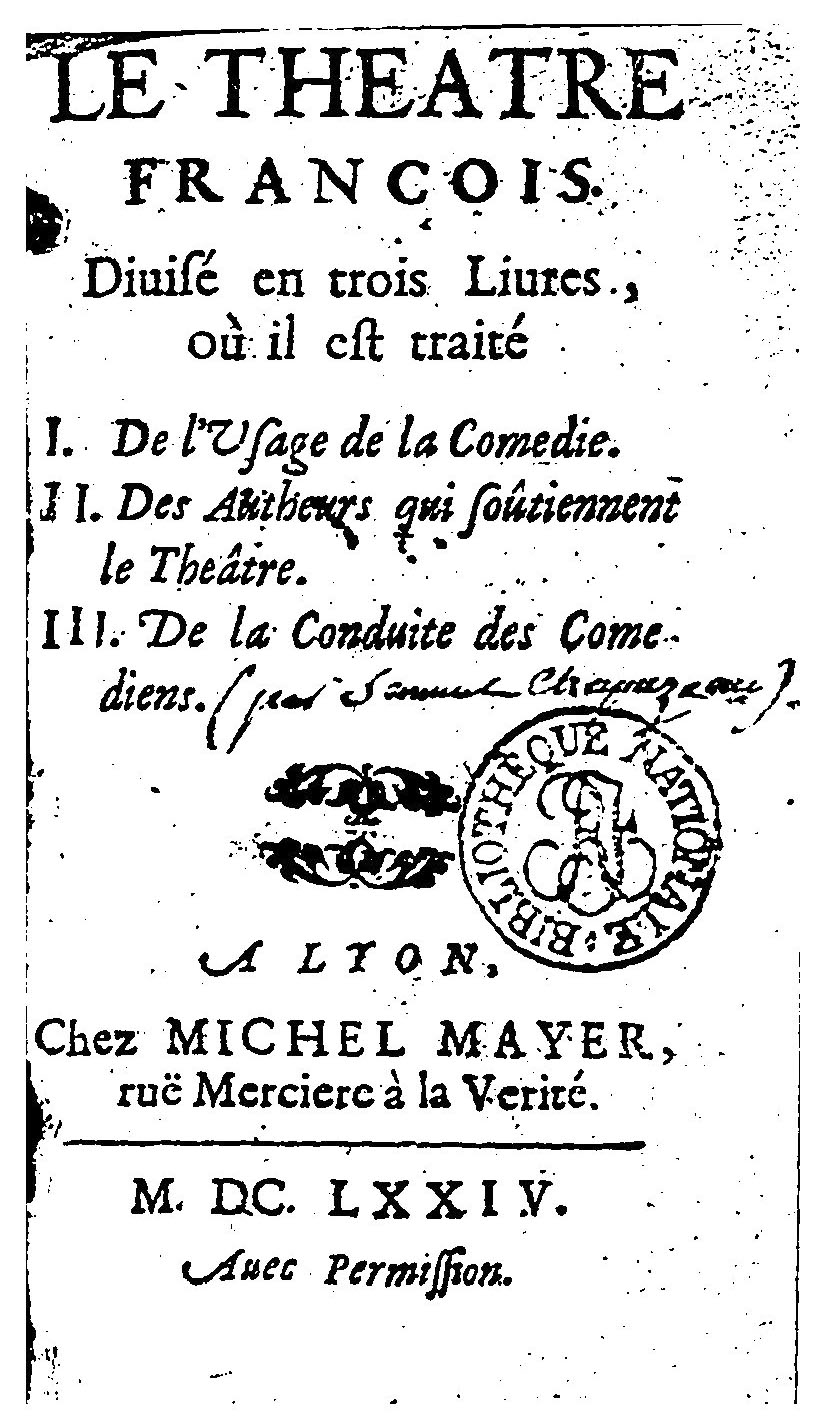
Title page of the 1674 edition

Le Théâtre François is a book in three volumes by Samuel Chappuzeau which is the main source of information on French theatre in the 17th century.

Its full title is Le Théâtre françois divisé en trois Livres, où il est traité I. De L’Usage de la Comédie. II. Des Auteurs qui soutiennent le Theatre. III. De la Conduite des Comédiens, Lyon, Michel Mayer, 1674

== Contents ==
The book contains descriptions of many aspects of the theatre, down even to trivial facts such as the serving of Spanish wine.

== Editions ==
New editions were printed in Brussels in 1867, and by Georges Monval in Paris in 1875.

A critical edition by Christopher Gossip was published in April 2009 (Gunter Narr Verlag, Tübingen). This is taken from a manuscript copy of 1673 which was apparently dedicated and given by Samuel to "La troupe du Roy", Molière's troupe.
