= Modlin, Nowy Dwór Mazowiecki =

Village in Poland

Coordinates: 52°26′N 20°41′E

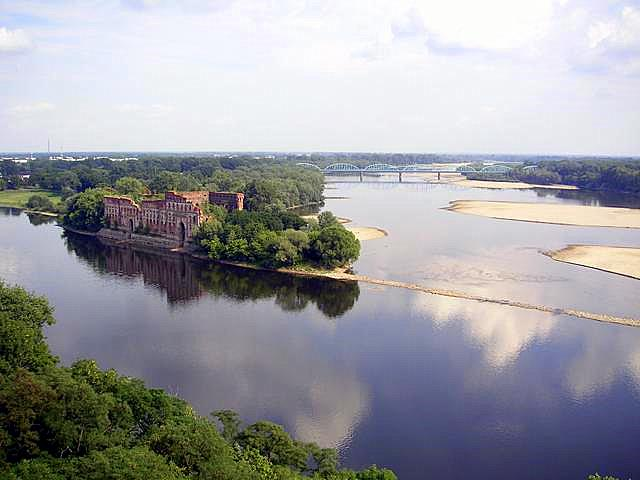
Confluence of the Narew and Vistula River at Nowy Dwór Mazowiecki. Ruins of the 19th century fortress granary on the left.

Modlin was a village near Warsaw in Poland near the banks of rivers Narew and Vistula. In 1961 it was incorporated into the town of Nowy Dwór Mazowiecki.

There is a former Modlin Fortress holding a junction of the two rivers, built in the 19th century, and last used during World War II. Currently, there is Modlin Airport in a part of the fortress.

== See also ==
- Modlin Airport
- Nowy Modlin
