= Akhmedkent =

Akhmedkent Ахмедкент Ахӏмадла шши ГIяхIмалаша
- Selo
- Location within Republic of Dagestan Location within Russia
- Coordinates: 42°07′N 47°48′E
- Country: Russia
- Region: Republic of Dagestan
- District: Kaytagsky District
- Time zone: UTC+3:00

Akhmedkent (Russian: Ахмедкент; Kaitag: Ахӏмадла шши; Dargwa: ГIяхIмалаша) is a rural locality (a selo) and the administrative centre of Akhmedkentsky Selsoviet, Kaytagsky District, Republic of Dagestan, Russia. The population was 1,023 as of 2010. There are 28 streets.

== Geography ==
Akhmedkent is located 2 km west of Madzhalis (the district's administrative centre) by road. Madzhalis and Sanchi are the nearest rural localities.

== History ==
Whilst travelling in the Caucasus, German explorer Samuel Gottlieb Gmelin was taken hostage by Usmey Khan of Khaïtakes and died of ill treatment in captivity in Akhmedkent.

== Nationalities ==
Dargins live there.

== Notable people ==
- Gadzhimagomed Kambulatov (Hero of Socialist Labor)
- Galiz Chupanov (Hero of Socialist Labor)
- Samuel Gottlieb Gmelin (1745–1774), German physician and botanist
