= Studzianki, Masovian Voivodeship =

Studzianki
- Village
- Location within Poland
- Coordinates: 52°33′N 20°46′E
- Country: Poland
- Voivodeship: Masovian
- County: Nowy Dwór
- Gmina: Nasielsk

Studzianki [stuˈd͡ʑaŋki] is a village in the administrative district of Gmina Nasielsk, within Nowy Dwór County, Masovian Voivodeship, in east-central Poland.

The village is served by Studzianki Nowe railway station.
