= Goławice Drugie =

- Village
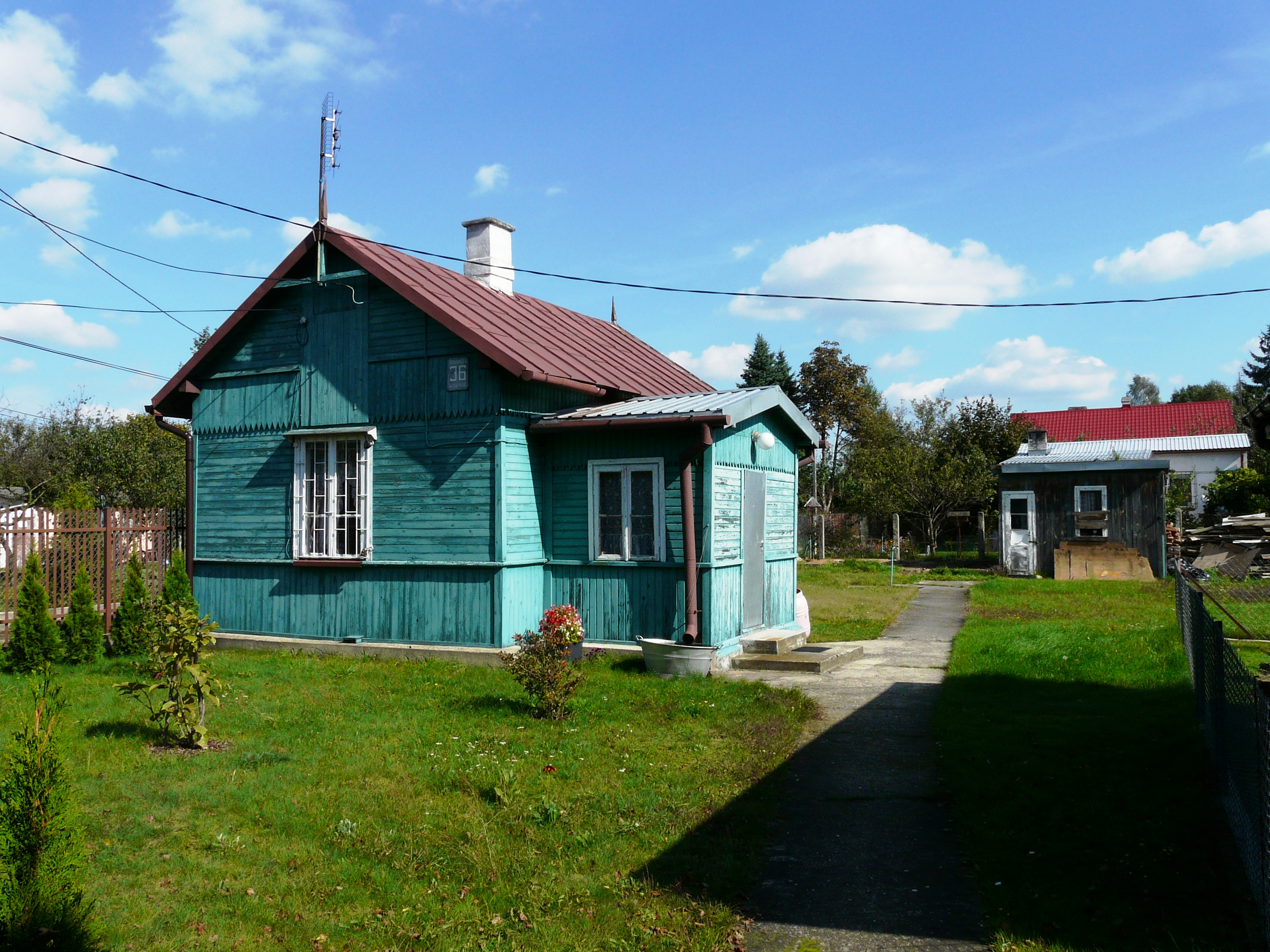
- Goławice Drugie, Poland

- Location within Poland
- Coordinates: 52°29′56″N 20°42′15″E
- Country: Poland
- Voivodeship: Masovian
- County: Nowy Dwór
- Gmina: Pomiechówek

Goławice Drugie [ɡɔwaˈvit͡sɛ ˈdruɡʲɛ] is a village in the administrative district of Gmina Pomiechówek, within Nowy Dwór County, Masovian Voivodeship, in east-central Poland.
