= Pomocnia, Gmina Pomiechówek =

Pomocnia
- Village
- Location within Poland
- Coordinates: 52°31′50″N 20°39′24″E
- Country: Poland
- Voivodeship: Masovian
- County: Nowy Dwór
- Gmina: Pomiechówek
- Population (approx.): 35

Pomocnia [pɔˈmɔt͡sɲa] is a village in the administrative district of Gmina Pomiechówek, within Nowy Dwór County, Masovian Voivodeship, in east-central Poland.
