= Wola Błędowska, Gmina Pomiechówek =

Wola Błędowska
- Village
- Location within Poland
- Coordinates: 52°31′47″N 20°38′4″E
- Country: Poland
- Voivodeship: Masovian
- County: Nowy Dwór
- Gmina: Pomiechówek
- Population: 80

Wola Błędowska [ˈvɔla bwɛnˈdɔfska] is a village in the administrative district of Gmina Pomiechówek, within Nowy Dwór County, Masovian Voivodeship, in east-central Poland.
