= Jacob Chappuzeau =

Jacob Chappuzeau (Russian: Яков Шапизо, romanized: Yakov Shapizo) was a naval officer in the Russian Fleet, where he was one of three captains decorated for their part in the Battle of Ösel Island. He rose to be commander of the Russian naval base at Reval (now Tallinn).

== Life ==
He was a grandson of the author and playwright Samuel Chappuzeau, but his birth year is not known, though it was probably between 1687 and 1689. Nothing is known of his early life, but it is most likely that he was born in London where his father Laurent Chappuzeau lived from 1684 to 1689. Laurent was married (twice) at St James Duke's Place during this period. We first hear of Jacob in Russian documents from 1716 which state that he was transferred from the British Navy to the Russian Fleet, at George I of Great Britain's request, as Captain 3rd Class.

It is not clear whether he was regarded as French (like his father) or English. He is referred to as both in different documents. On the Tsar's birthday in 1719, he and two other captains captured three Swedish vessels in what was the Russian fleet's first successful battle. For this, he was awarded a gold medal by the Tsar, and promoted to Captain, 2nd class.

Jacob married a noblewoman, Anne Kellermann, in St Petersburg, and had 10 children. That he was held in high regard is proven by the fact that the godfather of one of his daughters was Count Fyodor Apraksin, Admiral and member of the Russian Supreme Privy Council.

His eldest son, Alexander Chappuzeau (1720–1755), was aide de camp to Count Jean Armand de L'Estocq, who was involved in 1741 in putting Elisabeth of Russia on the throne.

Jacob died in Reval in 1734.
