= Kosewo, Gmina Pomiechówek =

Kosewo
- Village
- Location within Poland
- Coordinates: 52°28′1″N 20°40′40″E
- Country: Poland
- Voivodeship: Masovian
- County: Nowy Dwór
- Gmina: Pomiechówek

Kosewo [kɔˈsɛvɔ] is a village in the administrative district of Gmina Pomiechówek, within Nowy Dwór County, Masovian Voivodeship, in east-central Poland.
