= Stanisławowo, Gmina Pomiechówek =

Stanisławowo
- Village
- Location within Poland
- Coordinates: 52°27′47″N 20°43′20″E
- Country: Poland
- Voivodeship: Masovian
- County: Nowy Dwór
- Gmina: Pomiechówek

Stanisławowo [staniswaˈvɔvɔ] is a village in the administrative district of Gmina Pomiechówek within Nowy Dwór County, Masovian Voivodeship, in east-central Poland.

Along the main street of Stanisławowo on a spacious plot, there is Orthodox Church of St. Alexandra. During World War II, the church was again severely damaged, and after the war, most local parishioners were forcibly relocated to the Soviet Union. The building was restored for liturgical use in the early 1990s; previously, services had been held in an adapted room in the parish house. In 2016, another renovation was completed, including the construction and gilding of new domes.
