= Jean Armand de Lestocq =

French adventurer (1692–1767)

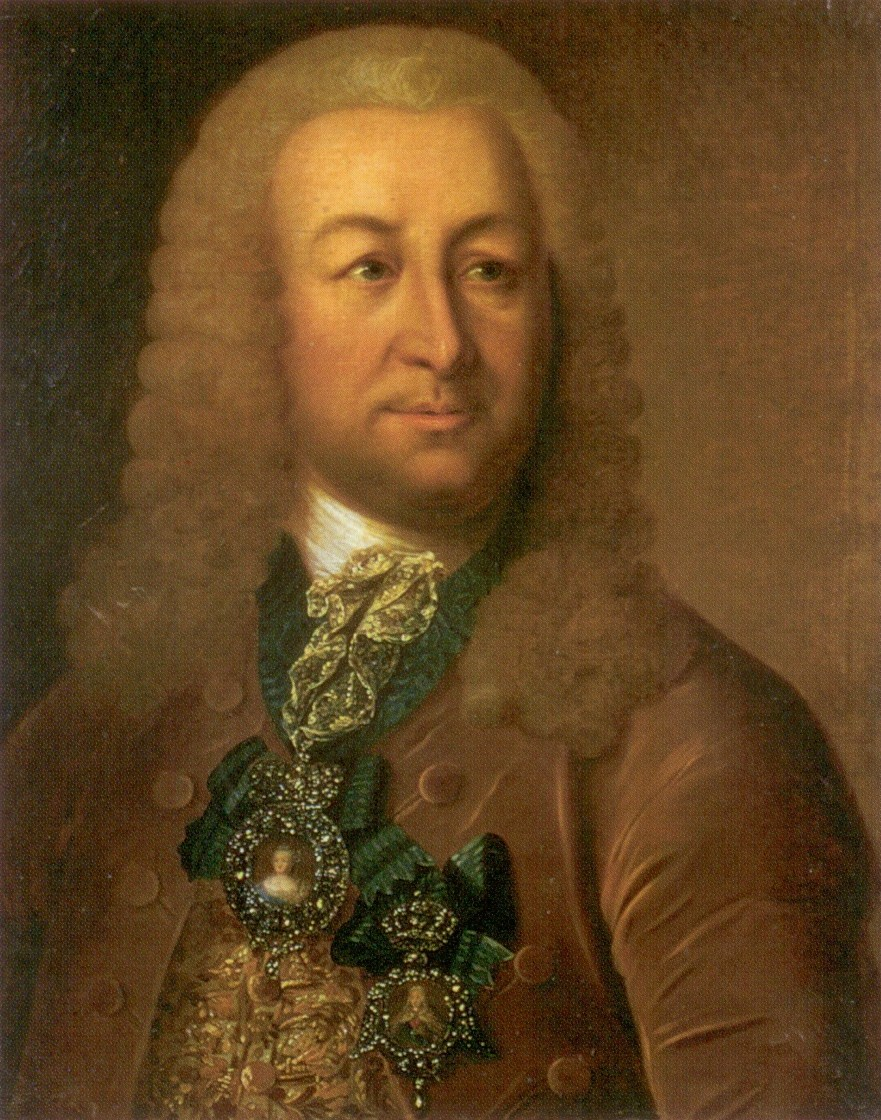
Portrait by Georg Christoph Grooth (1740s)

Count Jean Armand de Lestocq (German: Johann Hermann Lestocq; Russian: Иван Иванович Лесток, romanized: Ivan Ivanovich Lestok; 29 April 1692, in Lüneburg – 12 June 1767, in Saint Petersburg) was a French adventurer and court physician in Russia. He wielded immense influence on Russian foreign policy during the early reign of Empress Elizabeth.

== Biography ==
Coming from a noble family of Champagne, as a youth he was committed to prison for a petty offense. He was liberated on the urging of Françoise-Marie de Bourbon (1677–1749), legitimised daughter of Louis XIV and Françoise-Athénaïs, marquise de Montespan. Françoise-Marie was also married at the time to Philippe II, Duke of Orléans. She was thus a well-connected patroness.

In 1709, Lestocq arrived in Saint Petersburg in the capacity of a court physician. He was well regarded by Catherine I of Russia until 1720, when her husband had him exiled to Kazan for having seduced a jester's daughter. Upon the Emperor's death, Catherine summoned her favourite physician to the Russian capital, where his light-hearted character made him friends with her daughter Elizaveta Petrovna, whom he reportedly cured of syphilis.

More than anyone else, Lestocq helped prepare the 1741 coup d'etat which brought Elizaveta to the throne. He shaped Elizaveta's actions according to the advice of the French ambassador Marquis de La Chétardie and the Swedish ambassador, who were particularly interested in toppling the regime of Anna Leopoldovna, as France sought to counterbalance the Austrian influence at the Russian court and Sweden waged a war against Russia at that time.

After Elizavesta's coronation, Lestocq and La Chetardie attempted to dominate state power. The physician received a pension of 15,000 livres from the king of France and sought to influence Russian foreign policy accordingly. Another beneficiary from Lestocq's intrigues was the King of Prussia, who persuaded Emperor Charles VII to make him an imperial count. In 1743, Lestocq forged the so-called Lopukhina Conspiracy to engineer the downfall of Chancellor Aleksey Bestuzhev. It was he who suggested Sophie Augusta Fredericka of Anhalt-Zerbst (the future Catherine the Great), a Prussian protégé, as a bride for the heir apparent.

In 1745, Bestuzhev, still in power, succeeded in intercepting Lestocq's correspondence with La Chetardie, which resulted in the latter being banished from Russia. Three years later Lestocq, who continued to intrigue against Bestuzhev, was accused of plotting to dethrone Elizaveta in favor of the Prussophile heir to the throne. He and his aide de camp, Alexander Chappuzeau, nephew of his brother Johann Ludwig von L'Estocq, were both arrested. Lestocq was tortured in the Secret Chancellery and sentenced to death. The Empress intervened and had him instead exiled, first to Uglich and then to Veliky Ustyug. Only upon her death was Lestocq restored to his estates and allowed to return to the Russian capital.

Lestocq was married first to Barbara von Rutenhjelm, then to Alida Müller, described as 'dirty and drunken', who died in November 1743. On 22 November 1747 he married, in Saint Petersburg, Maria Aurora von Mengden (born 1720), daughter of friherre Magnus Gustav von Mengden (1663–1726), former Lord Marshal of Swedish Livonia.

== See also ==
- Anton Wilhelm von L'Estocq (1738–1815)
