= Samuel Chappuzeau =

French scholar, author, poet and playwright (1625–1701)

Samuel Chappuzeau (16 June 1625, Paris – 31 August 1701) was a French scholar, author, poet and playwright whose best-known work today is Le Théâtre François, a description of French theatre in the seventeenth century.

Chappuzeau's play Le Cercle des Femmes is widely regarded as one of the main sources for Molière's masterpiece Les Précieuses Ridicules, but his influence on the "Golden Age of French Drama" has in the past been seriously underestimated. Among other things, Chappuzeau played a substantial part in "discovering" Molière when he gave his travelling troupe a glowing review in his book Lyon dans son lustre in 1656.

Chappuzeau is credited with a number of "firsts," including being the first writer to introduce satire to French farce, and the first to set a play in China.

Later, he composed Tavernier's famous travel guides from notes and dictation, though this task seems to have been forced upon him, much against his will, by the King (Louis XIV).

Chappuzeau also wrote sermons, odes, dictionaries, and geographical books, and was still working on his Nouveau Dictionaire almost up to his death.

== Early life ==
Though his family originated in Poitiers, where his grandfather François was a 'procureur' and owned hemp fields and a vineyard, Chappuzeau was born in Paris, where his father Charles was a lawyer and member of the Noblesse de Robe. The youngest of six, or possibly seven, children, he was educated in the Calvinist school in Châtillon-sur-Loing (now known as Châtillon-Coligny) and in Geneva. In 1643, he went to Montauban to study Theology.

After a period in which he accompanied a young nobleman on journeys to Scotland and England, he traveled to the Netherlands in 1648 and spent some time in the Hague, where he was friends with some of the leading scholars of the day, among them Comenius, Claude Saumaise, and Constantijn Huygens.

== Career ==
He then spent two years in Kassel as private secretary to Countess Amalie Elisabeth of Hanau-Münzenberg, who was a granddaughter of William I of Orange-Nassau, (also known as William the Silent). After her death in 1651, and the consequent loss of his post, he decided that his future was as an author. He had published his first and only novel Ladice in 1650, and a number of books and plays followed during the 1650s. Working for a time as a proof-reader in Lyon no doubt left him with a good understanding of the publishing business.

Here, he also married his first wife, Maria de la Sarraz, originally from La Sarraz, Cossonay, whose ancestors were said by Chappuzeau to have included David le Boiteux, Principal of the college in Geneva. This statement to the Geneva Council now seems to have been false, as is the often-posted claim that she was from the Salteur de la Serraz family - she was too early for that. Their first child, Laurent Chappuzeau, was born in Lyon before 1655. (Laurent later became horologer, or clockmaker, to the Elector of Hanover)

In 1656 he returned to Amsterdam to live, where his second son Christophe was born, and in 1659, he was appointed tutor to the young Prince William III of Orange, who later became King of England. During this happy period, two more children were born, and Chappuzeau witnessed the festivities on the event of the Restoration of the English Monarchy, addressing an ode to the new King on board HMS Royal Charles. Unfortunately, this appointment came to an end after the death of Mary Stuart, Princess of Orange, William's mother.

== Return to France ==
He then moved back to Charenton, near Paris and set up a small school there. At this time, several of his plays were presented at Paris theatres, including one by Molière's troupe as thanks for his promotion of their troupe in his book. However, he was soon caught up, through no fault of his own, in a controversy surrounding his friend, the preacher Alexander Morus and John Milton, and had to leave Paris when parents removed their sons from his school. Around the same time, in August 1662, his wife died soon after the birth of their fifth child, leaving him to remark "Un malheur vient rarement seul." He married again to Marie Trichot (daughter of Louis Trichot of Sedan, Ardennes), and took refuge in the Republic of Geneva, his new wife's home state, where he was granted citizenship in 1666.

== Travels ==
From here, he traveled throughout Europe collecting information for a series of geographical/political books, including Suite de L'Europe Vivante, which were published between 1666 and 1673. He visited London in 1667 and attended meetings of the Royal Society. At the end of 1671, he was exiled from Geneva due to a remark made in one of his books, and for some years lived in various places, including Lyon and Basel, and also in Paris where he worked on Tavernier's travel books from 1674 to 1676. It was during this period of exile that he wrote Le Théâtre François, the book for which he is best remembered. This was written at the request of Molière's troupe soon after Molière had died.

== Later years ==
In 1679, he was readmitted to Geneva, but in 1681, the French managed to halt work on his latest book, and 1682 he moved to Celle, where he remained for the last 20 years of his life as Head of Pages to George William, Duke of Brunswick-Lüneburg (Grandfather of George II of Great Britain). During this period, he worked constantly on his encyclopedia (Nouveau Dictionaire, never published and now lost), corresponding with leading scholars throughout Europe, including Pierre Bayle and also Gottfried Leibniz, who visited him at his home in Celle.

== Publications and works ==
- Ladice ou les victoires du grand Tamerlan (novel) published anonymously Paris, 1650
- Recueil de lettres. Recueil de poésies Manuscript of letters and poems, about 1650
- Sermon Prononce Devant Leurs Altesses de Hesse Kassel, 1650
- Lyon dans son lustre : discours divisé en deux parties Lyon, 1656
- Le Cercle des femmes ou le secret du lit nuptial 1656 (Play, Comedy) (See full scan at Gallica)
- Damon et Pythias, ou le Triomphe de l'Amour et de l'Amitié Amsterdam, 1657
- Chant nuptial, ou reprise des muses françoises, sur les pas des muses latines, à l'honneur du marriage de J. Raie et de C. de Lochorst 1658
- Armetzar ou les Amis ennemis, Leiden, 1658 (See full scan at Gallica)
- L'Inconstant vaincu, ou puni, (songs) 1660 (Anon, attributed but unlikely)
- Le Riche mécontent ou le noble imaginaire 1660 (Play)
- Ode à son altesse royale la princesse douairière d'Orange, sur son passage de Hollande en Angleterre. 1660
- L'Académie des Femmes, Paris, 1661 (Farce) (See full scan at Gallica)
- Le Muse enjouée ou le théâtre comique (poems)
- Le Colin-Maillard (Farce, English version Blindmans Buff), Paris, 1662
- Genève délivrée (1) , 1702 Celle (Poem and songs)
- Genève délivrée (2) , written 1662, published 1862 (Play)
- La Dame d'intrigue ou l'Avare dupé comédie adaptée de celle de Plaute et représentée en 1662
- Les entretiens familiers d'Erasme . Divisés en deux décades. Translated by S. Chappuzeau, Paris, 1662
- L'Avare dupé, ou l'Homme de paille, Paris, 1663 (Comedy)(See full scan at Gallica)
- Erasme de Rotterdam : Colloques choisis. Translated from Latin by Samuel Chappuzeau Paris, 1662
- Le Partisan dupé : Lyon, 1663 (Comedy)
- Histoire des Joyaux, et des principales richesses de l'Orient & de l'Occident, Genève, 1665 (Book, English edition 1671)
- Entretiens familiers, pour l'instruction de la noblesse étrangère, Français, Allemand et Latin Lyon, Genève, 1665
- Stances sur les armes victorieuses de Monseigneur le duc d'Enguyen, Paris, 1665 (See full scan at Gallica)
- Orbis physicus : h. e. utriusque sphaerae synopsis, in controversarium, quae hoc tempore agitari solent, latissimum campum brevissima et facili via deducens Geneva, 1665

Pavane's copy of L'Europe Vivante

- L'Europe vivante ou relation nouvelle historique et politique de tous ses États, Geneva and Paris, 1666, 1667 1669 1671
- Les Eaux de Pirmont, Lyon, 1669
- La Muse enjouée ou le théâtre comique, Lyon, about 1670
- L'Allemagne protestante : ou relation nouvelle d'un voyage aux cours des Électeurs et des Prince protestants de l'Empire en 1669, Genève, 1671 (Book)
- Entretiens familiers, pour l'instruction de la noblesse étrangère, Genève, 1671; Amsterdam 1675 (French-Dutch edition) (Book)
- La Relation nouvelle de l'estat présent de la Cour de son Altesse Charles Emmanuel II, Duc de Savoye, 1671 (Book)
- Œuvres poétiques nouvelles du Sieur S C : qui contiennent diverses pièces de théâtre, suivies de plusiers sonnets, odes, élégies & épigrammes, Paris, Jean Girin et Barthelemy Rivière
- Relation de l'estat present de la maison royale et de la cour de Savoye, Paris, 1673 (book)
- L'Allemagne, ou Relation nouvelle de toutes les cours de l'Empire, recueillie en deux voyages que l'autheur y a faits en 1669 et 1672, Paris, 1673 (book)
- Relation de l'estat present de la maison électorale et de la cour de Bavière, Paris, 1673
- Verses to the glory of the departed, Valentin Conrart, Paris 1675 (No copy known)
- Le Théâtre François divisé en trois Livres, où il est traité I. De L’Usage de la Comédie. II. Des Auteurs qui soutiennent le Théâtre. III. De la Conduite des Comédiens, Lyon, Michel Mayer, 1674 (See full scan at Gallica)
- Nouveau dictionnaire françois-aleman et aleman-françois qu’accompagne le latin, Basel, 1675
- Jetzlebenden Europa, ... (German version of L'Europe Vivante, 3 volumes), Frankfurt am Main 1675 (See scan of a title page)
- L'Orateur chrétien, ou Traité de l'excellence et de la pratique de la chaire, Paris, 1675 also listed as Maniere de bien Precher
- Nouveau recueil de comédies : représentées en divers temps sur les théâtres de Paris, Lyon, 1677–1678
- Les Parfaits amis ou le Triomphe de l'amour et de l'amitié, Lyon, 1677
- Icones historicae Veteris et Novi Testamenti : Figures historiques du V. et du N. Testament Geneva, 1680
- Europe, Pastorale héroïque, ornée de musique, de dances, de machines, & de changemens de théâtre:... Celle, 1689 (See full scan here)
- Idée du Monde ou introduction facile et méthodique à la cosmographie et à l’histoire : divisée en trios parties, Celle, 1690 (See scan of a title page and frontispiece)
- Les Privilèges du Cocuage (Cuckoldry). Anon, attributed, probably wrongly, to Samuel
- Les Frayeurs de Crispin (play). Anon, attributed, probably wrongly, to Samuel

Chappuzeau also contributed to other works, such as the 1689 supplement to Louis Moréri's Grand dictionnaire historique, and a description of Hesse in a geographical book. (Le Grand Atlas Ou Cosmographie Blaviane, Vol 3, 111-114 Description exacte De La Hesse, par le Sr Chappuzeau)

== Lost works ==
- Translation into French of Hoffman's 'Lexicon Universalle', Widerhold, Geneva 1689
- Nouveau Dictionnaire historique, géographique, chronologique & philologique, proposal printed Celle, 1694 (See scan of title page)

The first two volumes (of three) were sent to the printers in 1698, but the work was never finished.

== Sources ==
- Samuel Chappuzeau 1625–1701, a dissertation by Friedrich Meinel, University of Leipzig, 1908
- H.K. Eggers, Das altfranzösische Geschlecht Chappuzeau, 1880, updated 1968
- Sabine Haake, "Samuel Chappuzeau (1625–1701) : Leben und Werk", Thesis, Munich, 1973
- Samuel Chappuzeau, "Le Théâtre françois" crit. ed. C. Gossip (Tübingen: Gunter Narr Verlag, 2009)
- Jeanne Leroy-Fournier, "Les Origines poitevines de l’écrivain protestant Samuel Chappuzeau", Bulletin de la société des antiquaires de l’Ouest et des musées de Poitiers (1976), 13, ser. 4, pp. 121–132
- Jennings, Neil & Margaret Jones, "A Biography of Samuel Chappuzeau, a Seventeenth-Century French Huguenot Playwright, Scholar, Traveller, and Preacher: An Encyclopedic Life", New York, 2012, Edwin Mellen Press : ISBN 978-0-7734-2644-3
