= Błędowo, Gmina Pomiechówek =

Błędowo
- Village
- Location within Poland
- Coordinates: 52°33′N 20°41′E
- Country: Poland
- Voivodeship: Masovian
- County: Nowy Dwór
- Gmina: Pomiechówek

Błędowo [bwɛnˈdɔvɔ] is a village in the administrative district of Gmina Pomiechówek, within Nowy Dwór County, Masovian Voivodeship, in east-central Poland.
