= Gmina Pomiechówek =

Gmina Pomiechówek Pomiechówek Commune
- Gmina
- Flag Coat of arms

- Location within Poland
- Coordinates (Brody-Parcele): 52°29′N 20°45′E
- Country: Poland
- Voivodeship: Masovian
- County: Nowy Dwór
- Seat: Brody-Parcele

Area
  - Total: 102.31 km^{2} (39.50 sq mi)

Population (2011)
  - Total: 8,941
  - Density: 87.39/km^{2} (226.3/sq mi)
- Website: www.pomiechowek.pl

Gmina Pomiechówek is a rural gmina (administrative district) in Nowy Dwór County, Masovian Voivodeship, in east-central Poland. It takes its name from the village of Pomiechówek, but its seat is Brody-Parcele, which lies approximately 5 kilometres (3 mi) north-east of Nowy Dwór Mazowiecki and 33 km (20 mi) north-west of Warsaw.

The gmina covers an area of 102.31 square kilometres (39.5 sq mi), and as of 2006 its total population is 8,820 (8,941 in 2011).

== Villages ==
Gmina Pomiechówek contains the villages and settlements of Błędówko, Błędowo, Brody, Brody-Parcele, Bronisławka, Cegielnia-Kosewo, Czarnowo, Falbogi Borowe, Goławice Drugie, Goławice Pierwsze, Kikoły, Kosewko, Kosewo, Nowe Orzechowo, Nowy Modlin, Pomiechówek, Pomiechowo, Pomocnia, Śniadówko, Stanisławowo, Stare Orzechowo, Szczypiorno, Wójtostwo, Wola Błędowska, Wólka Kikolska, Wymysły and Zapiecki.

== Neighbouring gminas ==
Gmina Pomiechówek is bordered by the town of Nowy Dwór Mazowiecki and by the gminas of Nasielsk, Serock, Wieliszew and Zakroczym.
