= Laurent Chappuzeau =

Laurent Chappuzeau was Royal clockmaker to the Elector of Hanover (Later King George I of Great Britain).

He was the eldest son of the author and playwright Samuel Chappuzeau, but his birth year is not known, though it was probably between 1652 and 1655. Nothing is known of his early life, but it is certain that he was born in Lyon where his father was working as a proof-reader. He first appears in the records in 1658, when his father is in the Netherlands, and asks in a letter for him to be sent there from Lyon.

Samuel moved to Geneva in 1662, and he and his four sons, including Laurent, received citizenship there in 1666. In 1674, he is recorded as being apprenticed to watchmaker Antoine Rey. Nothing more is known about him until he arrived in London, where he lived from 1684 until 1689, and was married twice during this period at St James Duke's Place.

Note that due to the New Year starting on 25 March in the old calendar, the second marriage would have been in 1687, new style, and eighteen months after his first marriage. It is probable that his first wife Jean Goad (or Gode) died as a result of childbirth. In the registers of St Pauls, Covent Garden, vol IV, burials 1653-1752 we find on 25 May 1686 "Samuel son of Lawrence Chapeso" and "Jane, wife of Lawrence Lappuea" was buried in October. John Christian Chappuzeau, a watchmaker, was recorded in London between 1718 and 1745. It is possible that he was the child of the second marriage, which may explain why Laurent is recorded visiting England at least twice in the 1690s (1693 and 1697).

Laurent moved to Hanover in 1689, with his second wife Anne Noël (or Nouel), and probably one child (Jacob Chappuzeau). His daughter Helene Clara Chappuzeau was born in Hanover in 1690.

Not long after his father died, Laurent caused some controversy when he opened the "Electoral Café" in Hanover, opposite the castle. He is probably the French Café owner, M Chapezeau, referred to in the book ″The life and journal of Jonathan Belcher, the first-known, American-born Freemason″. Belcher stayed at the café for some days when he visited Hanover in 1704.
