= Pomiechówek =

- Village
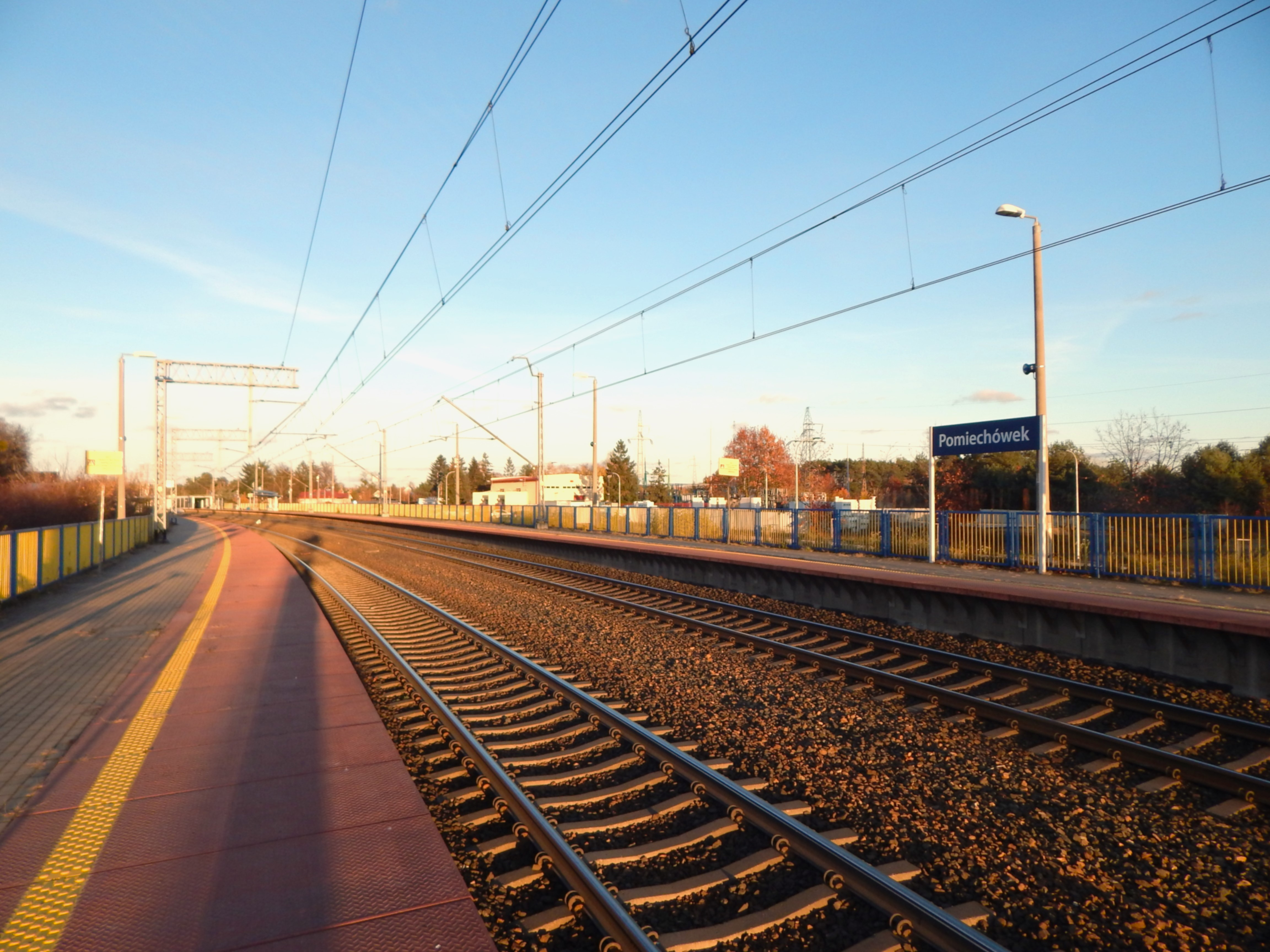

- Location within Poland
- Coordinates: 52°28′N 20°44′E
- Country: Poland
- Voivodeship: Masovian
- County: Nowy Dwór
- Gmina: Pomiechówek
- Website: http://www.pomiechowek.pl/

Pomiechówek [pɔmjɛˈxuvɛk] is a village in the administrative district of Gmina Pomiechówek, within Nowy Dwór County, Masovian Voivodeship, in east-central Poland.
