= Pomiechowo =

- Village
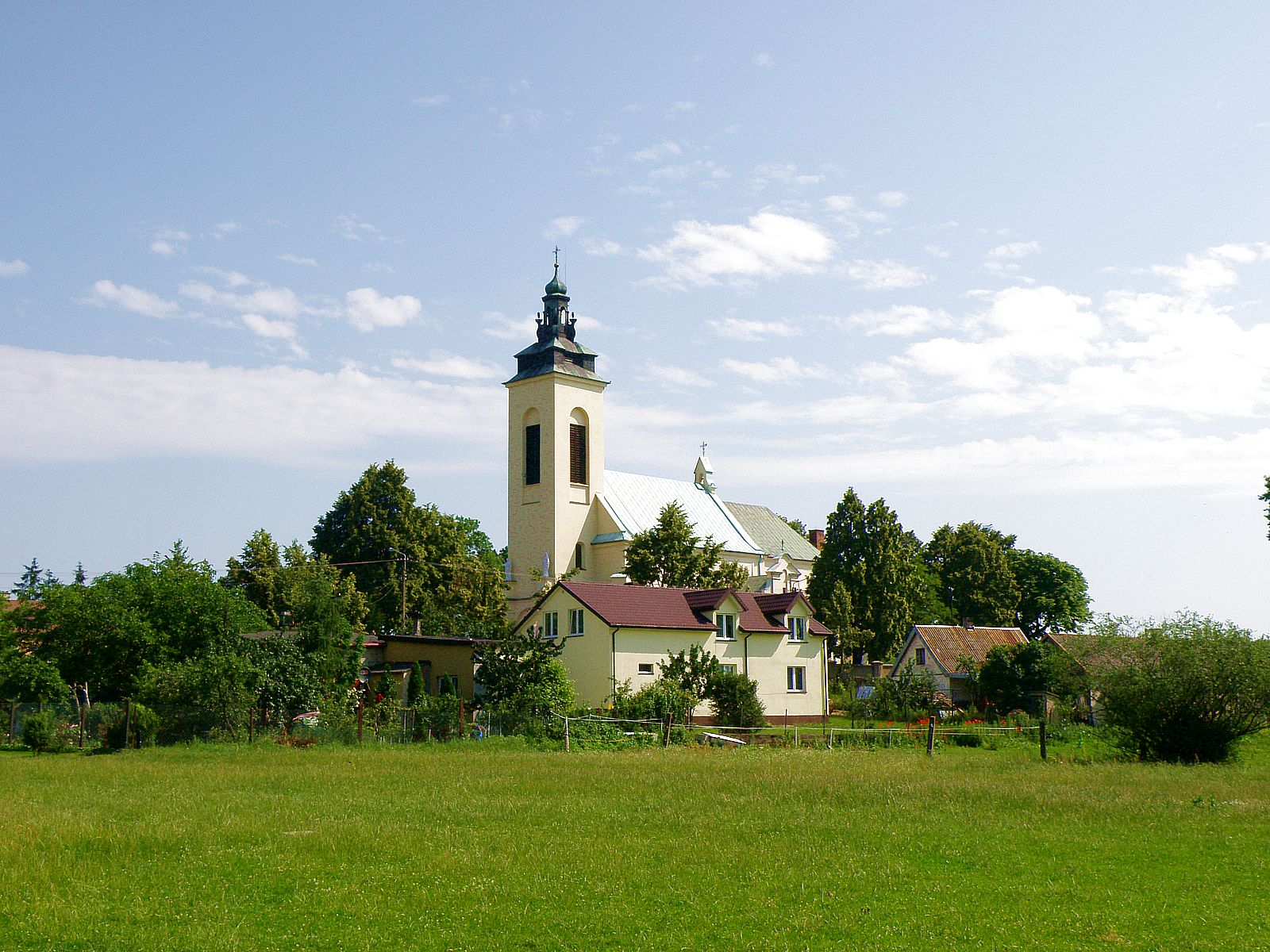
- Church of Saint Anne

- Location within Poland
- Coordinates: 52°28′4″N 20°44′7″E
- Country: Poland
- Voivodeship: Masovian
- County: Nowy Dwór
- Gmina: Pomiechówek
- Time zone: UTC+1 (CET)
  - Summer (DST): UTC+2 (CEST)

Pomiechowo [pɔmjɛˈxɔvɔ] is a village in the administrative district of Gmina Pomiechówek, within Nowy Dwór County, Masovian Voivodeship, in east-central Poland.

Five Polish citizens were murdered by Nazi Germany in the village during World War II.
