= Polesie (disambiguation) =

Polesie or Polesia is a swampy region in the Eastern European Plain lowland.

Polesie may also refer to:

== Belarus ==
- Polesia Region
- Polesie Marshes
- Polesie State Radioecological Reserve

== Poland ==
- Polesie, Kościan County in Greater Poland Voivodeship (west-central Poland)
- Polesie, Gmina Zaniemyśl, Środa County in Greater Poland Voivodeship (west-central Poland)
- Polesie, Łowicz County in Łódź Voivodeship (central Poland)
- Polesie, Piotrków County in Łódź Voivodeship (central Poland)
- Polesie, Poddębice County in Łódź Voivodeship (central Poland)
- Polesie, Wieruszów County in Łódź Voivodeship (central Poland)
- Polesie, Puławy County in Lublin Voivodeship (east Poland)
- Polesie, Gmina Tomaszów Lubelski, Tomaszów County in Lublin Voivodeship (east Poland)
- Polesie, Płońsk County in Masovian Voivodeship (east-central Poland)
- Polesie, Opole Voivodeship (south-west Poland)
- Polesie, Pomeranian Voivodeship (north Poland)
- Polesie Landscape Park
- Polesie National Park
- Polesie Voivodeship (1921–1939), administrative unit of interwar Poland
- Independent Operational Group Polesie

== Other ==
- Polesie Lowland
- Polesie (association), an association for the autonomy of the Polesia region
- Orlovskoye Polesie
- The ship named Polesie involved in the 2023 Heligoland ship collision
- Polesie class ship (1983–2008), class of passenger ships manufactured in Belarus

== See also ==
- Polissya (disambiguation)
