= Papal poet laureate =

Although popes have several times named poets laureate, the practice was never regular and never attained importance. The ceremony to laureate Camillo Querno, for example, was little more than a piece of entertainment. The pope could laureate a poet himself or delegate the authority to a papal count palatine or another poet laureate. For example, the papal laureate Johannes Rhagius paid 100 florins for the right to laureate six poets of his choosing. Pope Pius II, who had been laureated by the Emperor Frederick III before ascending the papal throne, never created any poets laureate. Nevertheless, papal poets laureate seem to have been considered of the same rank as the much more prominent imperial poets laureate. In 1512, there was a joint ceremony in which two poets were simultaneously laureated by the pope and an imperial representative.

== List of papal poets laureate ==
- Giovanni Aurispa, possibly laureated by Pope Eugene IV or Pope Nicholas V in Rome no later than 1459
- Leon Battista Alberti, possibly laureated by Pope Nicholas V no later than 1471
- Giovanni Gioviani Pontano, laureated by Pope Innocent VIII on 8 January 1486
- Johannes Rhagius, laureated in Rome between 1499 and 1501, possibly by Pope Alexander VI
- Francesco Maria Grapaldi, laureated by Pope Julius II in Rome on 11 November 1512
- Vincenzo Pimpinelli, laureated by Pope Julius II in Rome on 11 November 1512
- Camillo Querno, laureated by Pope Leo X in Rome in 1514
- Domenico Falugi, laureated by Pope Leo X in Rome on 19 July 1521
- Jakob Fischer, laureated no later than 1583, apparently by a pope
- Maciej Kazimierz Sarbiewski, laureated by Pope Urban VIII in 1623 after 26 August
- Bernardo Perfetti, laureated by Pope Benedict XIII in Rome on 6 or 13 May 1725
- Maria Maddalena Morelli Fernandez, laureated by Pope Pius VI in Rome on 31 August 1776

The anonymous "Lombard monk" (monachus Lombardus) whose commentary on Alexander of Villedieu's Doctrinale was published at Milan on 24 March 1484 may have been a papal poet laureate.

In 1577, Bartholomaeus Huber described himself as a "papal and imperial poet laureate", perhaps indicating that the titles were considered interchangeable.

== Bibliography ==
- Flood, John L. (2006). Poets Laureate in the Holy Roman Empire: A Bio-bibliographical Handbook. Walter de Gruyter.
- Haye, Thomas (2009). Päpste und Poeten: Die mittelalterliche Kurie als Objekt und Förderer panegyrischer Dichtung. Walter de Gruyter.
