= Giovanni Pontano =

Italian poet (1426–1503)

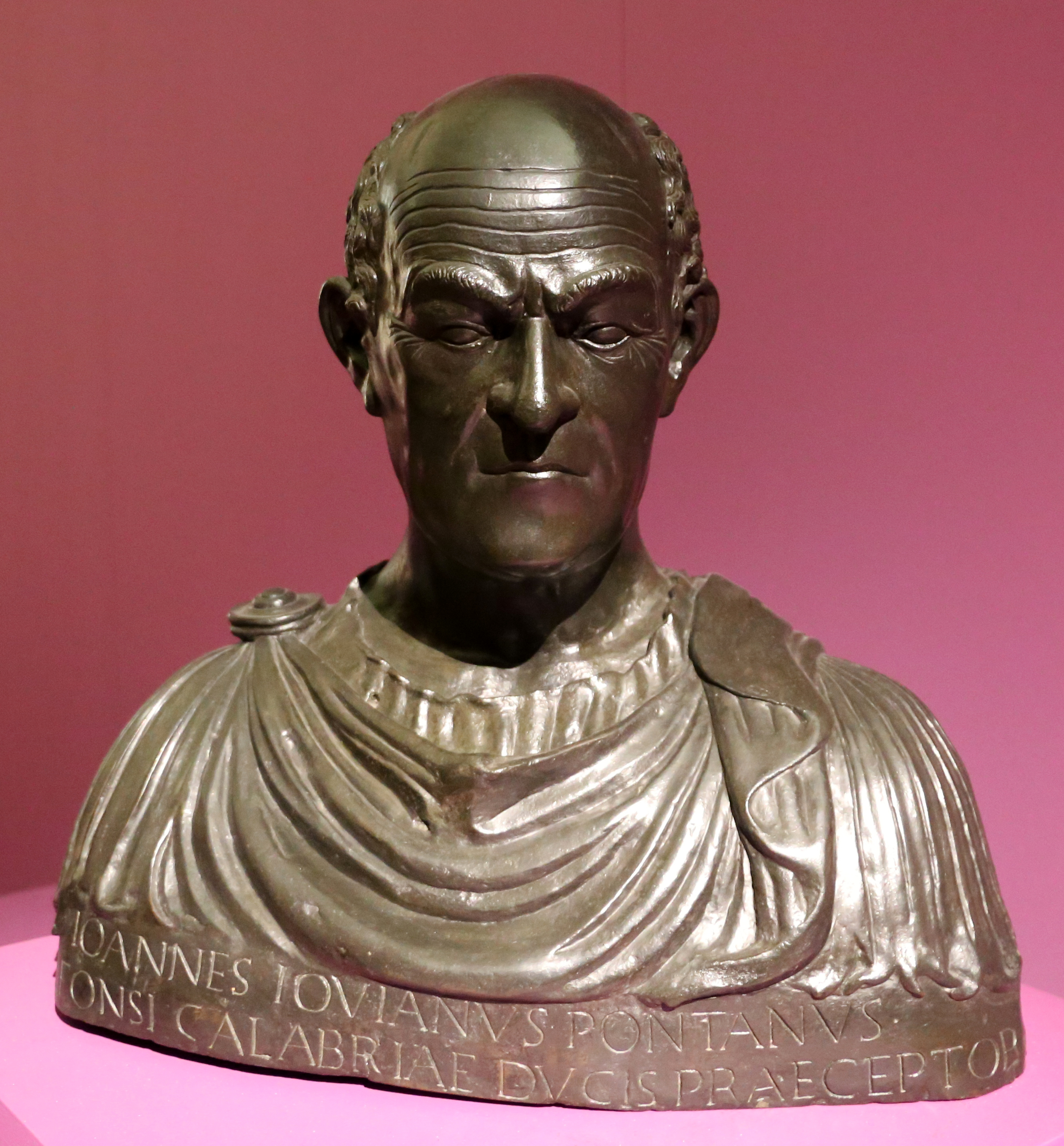
- Bust of Pontano by Adriano Fiorentino, in the Museo di Sant'Agostino di Genova
- Born: 1426 or 1429; Cerreto di Spoleto, Papal States (now in Umbria)
- Died: 1503; Naples, Kingdom of Naples
- Other names: Giovanni Gioviano Pontano; Latin: Ioannes Iovianus Pontanus
- Occupations: poet, humanist
- Known for: Accademia Pontaniana, poetry

Giovanni Pontano (1426–1503), later known as Giovanni Gioviano (Latin: Ioannes Iovianus Pontanus), was a humanist and poet from Cerreto di Spoleto, in central Italy. He was the leading figure of the Accademia Pontaniana after the death of Antonio Beccadelli in 1471, and the academy took his name.

== Biography ==
Pontano was born at Cerreto in the Duchy of Spoleto, where his father was murdered in one of the frequent civic brawls which then disturbed the peace of Italian towns. His date of birth is given in various sources between 1421 and 1429; it is often given as 1426, but may have been 1429.

His mother escaped with the boy to Perugia, and it was here that Pontano received his first instruction in languages and literature. Failing to recover his patrimony, he abandoned Umbria, and at the age of twenty-two established himself at Naples, which continued to be his chief place of residence during a long and prosperous career. He here began a close friendship with the distinguished scholar, Antonio Beccadelli, through whose influence he gained admission to the royal chancery of Alphonso the Magnanimous. Alphonso discerned the singular gifts of the young scholar, and made him tutor to his sons, notably Alfonso, who would reign for a single year but whose energies in the decade 1485 to 1495 brought the Renaissance to Naples in many fields, from poetry to villas, from portrait sculpture to fortifications. Pontano was laureated by Pope Innocent VIII on 8 January 1486. His connection with the Aragonese dynasty as political adviser, military secretary and chancellor was henceforth a close one; he passed from tutor to cultural advisor to Alfonso. The most doubtful passage in his diplomatic career is when he welcomed Charles VIII of France upon the entry of that king into Naples in 1495, thus showing that he was too ready to abandon the princes upon whose generosity his fortunes had been raised.

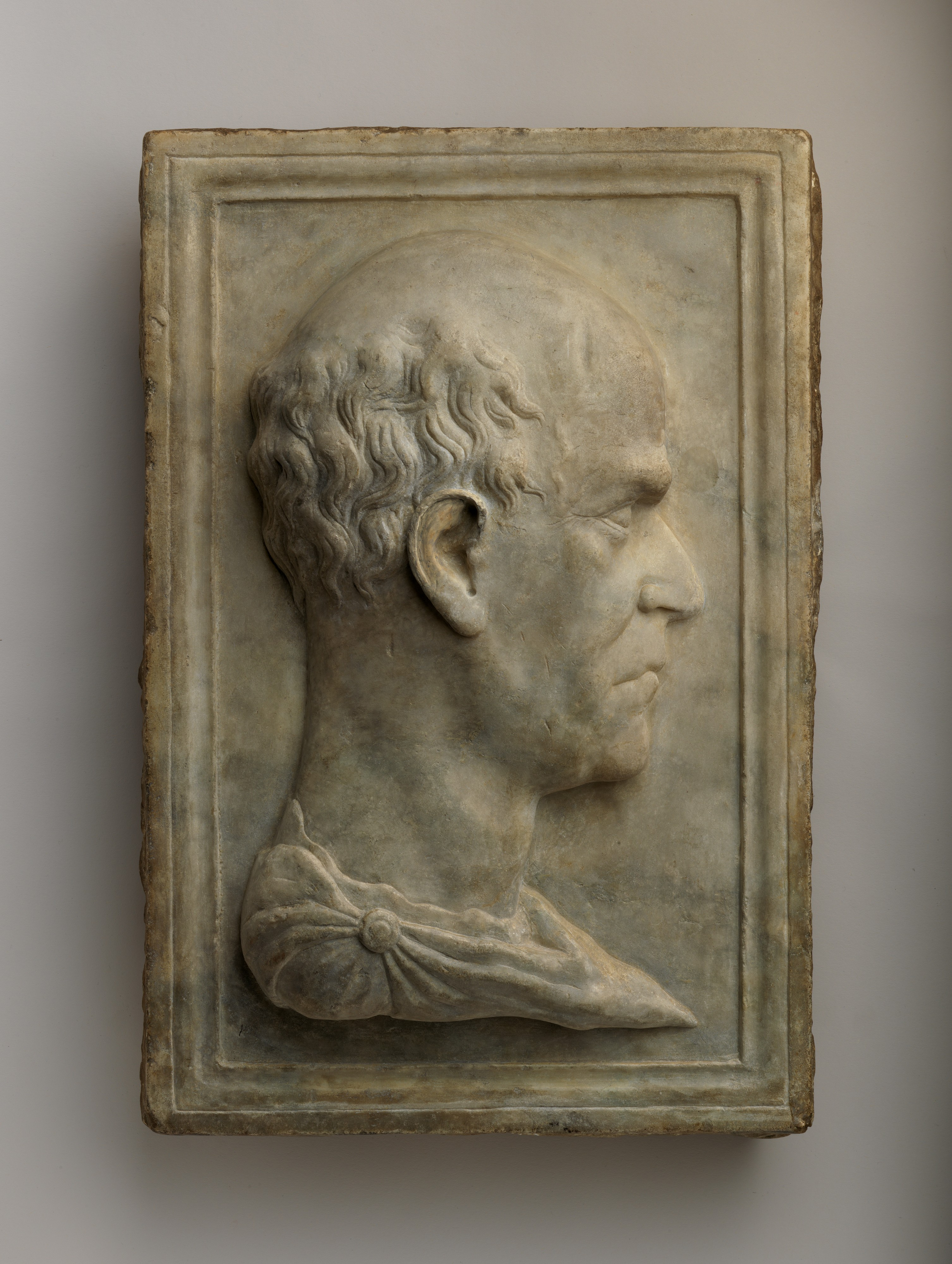
Relief of Pontano by Adriano Fiorentino

Pontano illustrates in a marked manner the position of power to which men of letters and learning had arrived in Italy. He entered Naples as a penniless scholar. He was almost immediately made the companion and trusted friend of its sovereign, loaded with honours, lodged in a fine house, enrolled among the nobles of the realm, enriched, and placed at the very height of social importance. Following the example of Pomponio Leto in Rome and of Cosimo de' Medici at Florence, Pontano led and lent his name to the Accademia Pontaniana, for the meetings of learned and distinguished men. This became the centre of fashion as well as of erudition in the southern capital, and subsists today.

In 1461 he married his first wife, Adriana Sassone, who bore him son Lucio and three daughters before her death in 1491. Nothing distinguished Pontano more than the strength of his domestic feeling. He was passionately attached to his wife and children; and, while his friend Beccadelli signed the licentious verses of Hermaphroditus, his own Muse celebrated in liberal but loyal strains the pleasures of conjugal affection, the charm of infancy and the sorrows of a husband and a father in the loss of those he loved. Not long after the death of his first wife Pontano took in second marriage a beautiful girl of Ferrara, who is only known to us under the name of Stella.

Although he was at least sixty-five years of age at this period, his poetic faculty displayed itself with more than usual warmth and lustre in the glowing series of elegies, styled Eridanus, which he poured forth to commemorate the rapture of this union. Stella's one child, Lucilio, survived his birth but fifty days; nor did his mother long remain to comfort the scholar's old age. Pontano had already lost his only son by the first marriage; therefore his declining years were solitary. He died in 1503 at Naples, where a remarkable group of terracotta figures, life-sized and painted, still adorns his tomb in the church of Monte Oliveto. He is there represented together with his patron Alfonso and his friend Jacopo Sannazaro in adoration before the dead Christ.

As a diplomat and state official Pontano played a part of some importance in the affairs of southern Italy and in the Barons' War, the wars with the Papacy, and the expulsion and restoration of the Aragonese dynasty. But his chief claim is as a scholar. His writings divide themselves into dissertations upon such topics as the "Liberality of Princes", "Ferocity" or "Magnificence", in which he argued that architecture and great monuments were the mark of a great ruler, composed in the rhetorical style of the day, and his poems.

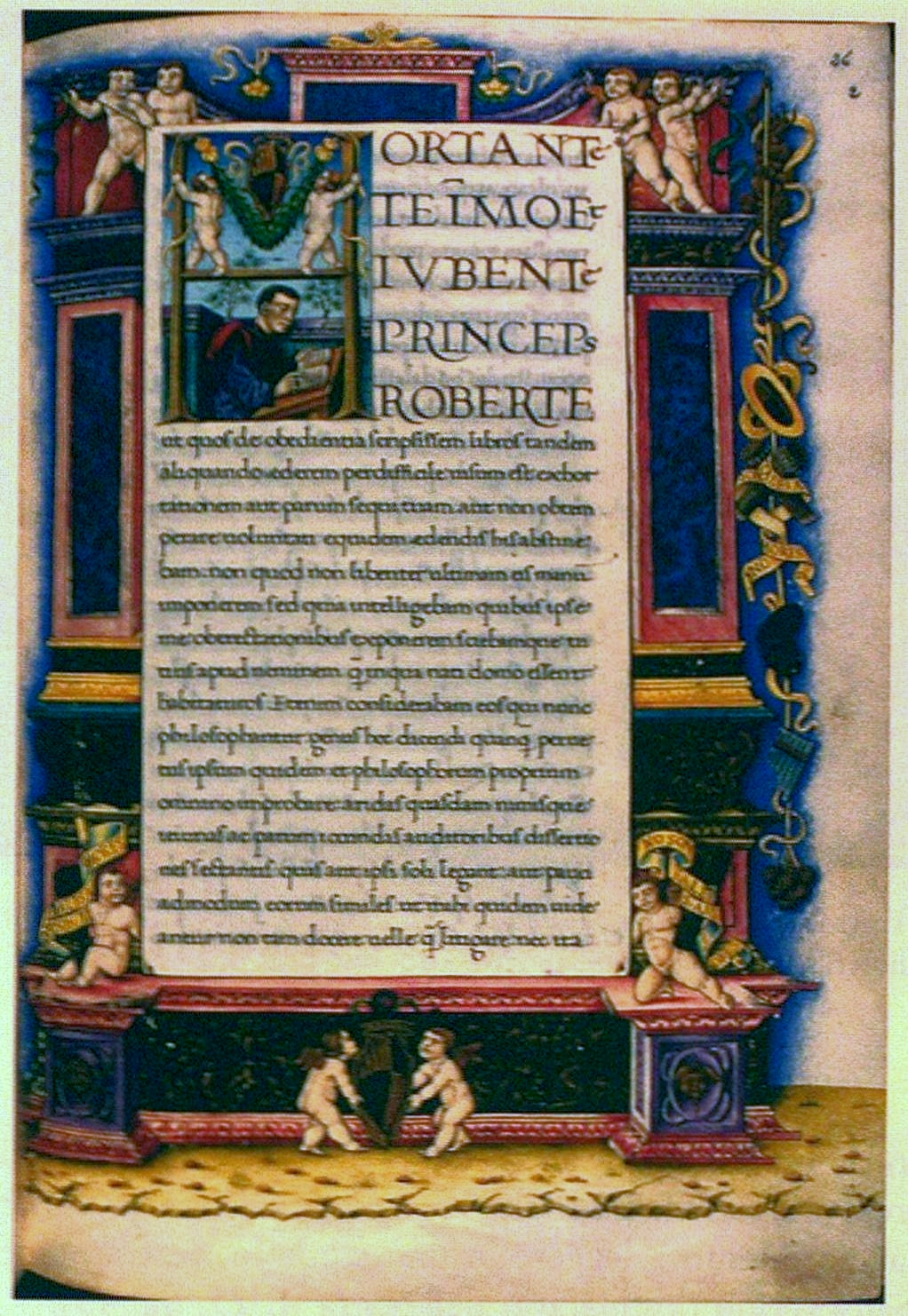
De oboedientia in an illuminated manuscript by Cristoforo Majorana

He was noted for the energy of his Latin style, his intellectual ability, and his capacity, uncommon among his contemporaries, to express aspects of contemporary life and personal emotion in a manner that combined classical form with an individual voice. His prose treatises have been considered more informative for the study of social customs than comparable works by Poggio Bracciolini. However, he was chiefly recognized for his work as a Latin poet.

His ambitious didactic poem in hexameters, entitled Urania, which presents the astronomical knowledge of the period and incorporates mythological elements, was widely admired in Italy and remains an example of inventive and technically proficient composition. Another didactic work, De hortis Hesperidum, on the cultivation of orange trees, has also been regarded as a notable contribution.

His most distinctive verse compositions are elegiac and hendecasyllabic poems on personal subjects, including De conjugali amore, Eridanus, Tumuli, Naeniae, and Baiae. In these works, he addresses emotional themes with a directness and attention to lived experience that has been cited to contextualize their erotic elements.

Pontano's prose and poems were printed by Aldus Manutius at Venice. Pontano's Latin translation of Claudius Ptolemy's astrological work, the Tetrabiblos (or Quadripartitum) was first printed in 1535 as part of Joachim Camerarius first portfolio edition that also included the Greek text.

== Works ==
- De Obedientia (1485)

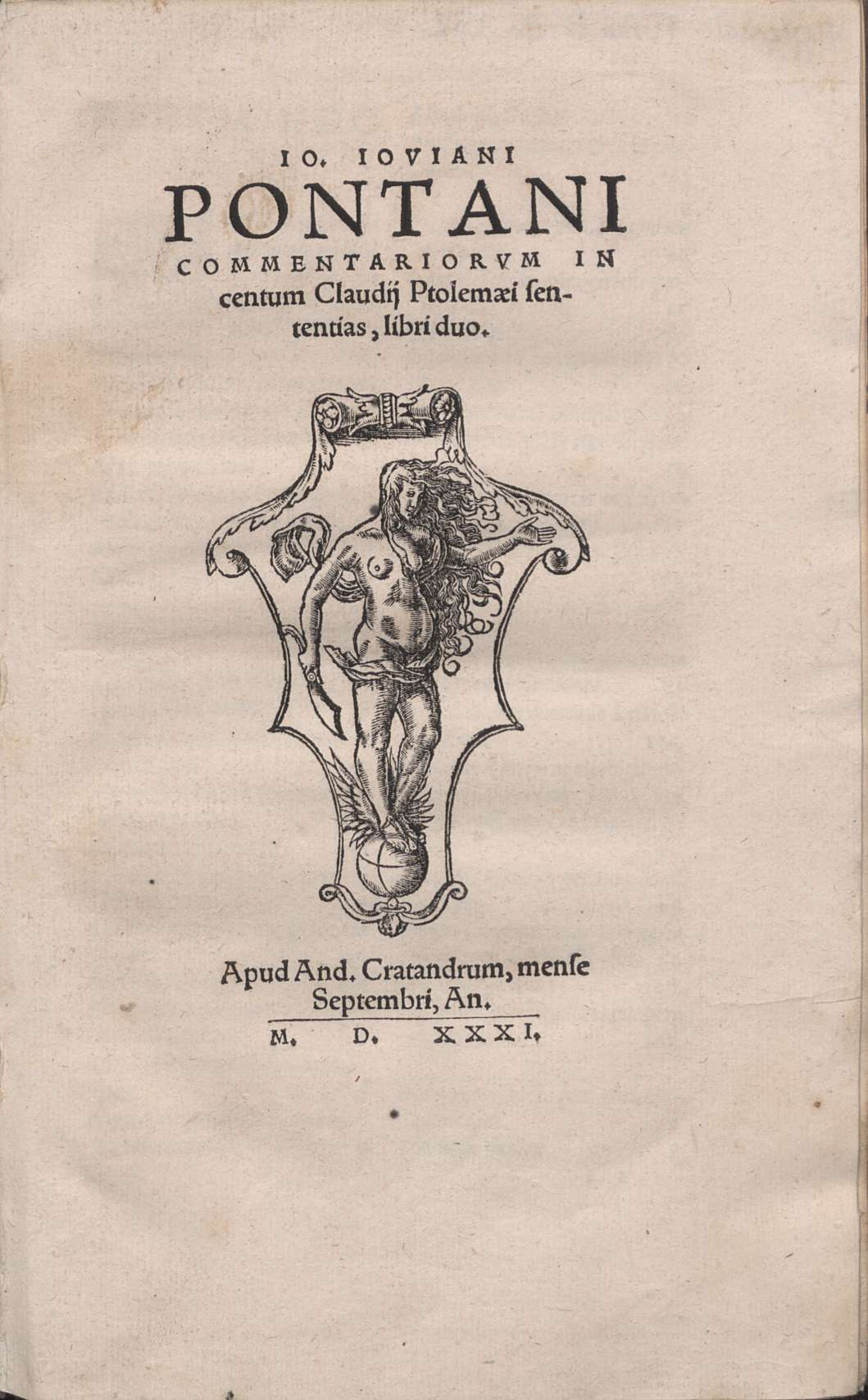
Commentariorum in centum Claudii Ptolemaei sententias, 1531

- Opere (in Latin). Vol. 1. Firenze: eredi Filippo Giunta (1.). 1520.
- Opere (in Latin). Vol. 3. Firenze: eredi Filippo Giunta (1.). 1520.
- De prudentia (in Latin). Firenze: eredi Filippo Giunta (1.). 1520.
- De sermone (in Latin). Firenze: eredi Filippo Giunta (1.). 1520.
- Commentariorum in centum Claudii Ptolemaei sententias (in Latin). Basel: Andreas Cratander. 1531.
- De rebus coelestibus (in Latin). Firenze: eredi Filippo Giunta (1.). 1520.
- Commentariorum in centum Claudii Ptolemaei sententias (in Latin). Basel: Andreas Cratander. 1531.
