= Bożewo =

Bożewo refers to the following places in Poland:

- Bożewo, Płońsk County
- Bożewo, Sierpc County
