= Žygimantas Liauksminas =

Lithuanian Jesuit theologian, philosopher

Žygimantas Liauksminas (Latin: Sigismundus Lauxminus, Polish: Zygmunt Lauxmin; 1596 or 1597 – 11 September 1670) was a Lithuanian Jesuit theologian, philosopher, theorist of rhetoric and music, founder of Lithuanian musicology, one of the first Lithuanian professors and rectors of the University of Vilnius.

== Biography ==
Liauksminas was born in Samogitia, and joined the Jesuit Order in 1616. In 1618–1619, he studied rhetoric at the Jesuit College in Pułtusk. He continued his education at the University of Vilnius studying philosophy in 1619–1621 and theology in 1625–1629. In 1642, Liauksminas became a Doctor of Theology.

Liauksminas taught rhetoric at the Polotsk College and Nyasvizh College in 1631–1635, philosophy and theology at the University of Vilnius in 1635–1642, philosophy at the Braunsberg College in 1642–1644. Was a rector of the Płock College in 1644–1647, Polotsk College in 1650–1655, and Kražiai College in 1661–1665. He was vice-rector (1655–1658) and vice-chancellor (1665–1670) of the University of Vilnius.

He was a vice-provincial superior of Lithuania in the Jesuit Order. In 1645–1646, he substituted a provincial superior and administered a religious province during the 9th General Congregation. As a general elector from Lithuanian Jesuits, he also participated in the 10th (1652) and 11th (1661) General Congregations in Rome. He died in Vilnius, Grand Duchy of Lithuania.

== Works ==
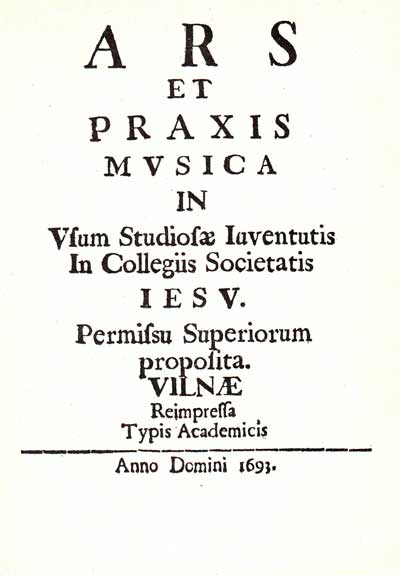
Title page of 1693 version of Ars et praxis musica

Liauksminas has written theological works (The Justification of the Catholic Church, Demonstratio Catholicae Ecclesiae, circa 1643, third edition - 1648), A Theology for the Church (Theologia ecclesiastica, 1665, second edition - 1675), first original Ancient Greek Grammar in the Polish–Lithuanian Commonwealth - Summary of the Greek Textbook (Epitome institutionum linguae graecae, 1655).

Most famous work of Ž. Liauksminas - An Oratory Practice and the Rules of the Rhetoric Art (Praxis oratoria sive praecepta artis rhetoricae, 1648). In it he, making references to Aristotle, Cicero, Quintilian, criticizes the faults of the Baroque literary style - its pomp, fogginess, macaronics and praises sober mind, clarity of thought, structured language. An annex of this book - A Kernel of Dialectics (Medulio dialecticae) is an introduction to scholastic logic, introducing its main categories and thinking methods. Praxis oratoria sive praecepta artis rhetoricae was widely used in the jesuit schools, issued in Munich (1664), Frankfurt an Main (1666), Cologne (1680, 1705, 1707, 1717), Würzburg (1690), Prague (1710), Vienna (1720), Košice (1732).

He also has written first textbook of music in Lithuania - The Art and Practice of Music (Ars et praxis musica, 1667, 1693, 1977 in Lithuanian). Common fundamentals of music explained - names of the music notes, a scale, clefs; exercises and church music examples included, plainsong (cantus planus), many-voiced, Gregorian, hard (cantus durus) and soft (cantus mollis) chant modes examined.

Žygimantas Liauksminas wrote poems in Ancient Greek, a panegyric to Władysław IV Vasa, sermons. Manuscripts of the tractates of theology About the Single God (Tractatus de Deo Uno), A Theologic Tractate about the Law and Justice (Tractatus theologicus de jure et justitia) are also survived.

== Bibliography ==
- (In Latin) Liauksminas, Žygimantas, 1596-1670. Praxis oratoria.
- (In Latin) Liauksminas, Žygimantas, 1596-1670. Medulla dialecticae.
- (In Latin) Liauksminas, Žygimantas, 1596-1670. Ars et praxis musica.
- (In Latin) Liauksminas, Žygimantas, 1596-1670. Panegyricus Vladislao IV.
- (In Lithuanian) Žygimantas Liauksminas, Rinktiniai raštai (Mintis, 2011, p. 440) ISBN 9785417008641
- (In Lithuanian) Index Lituanicus - works of Žygimantas Liauksminas
