= Maciej Kazimierz Sarbiewski =

Polish Latin poet

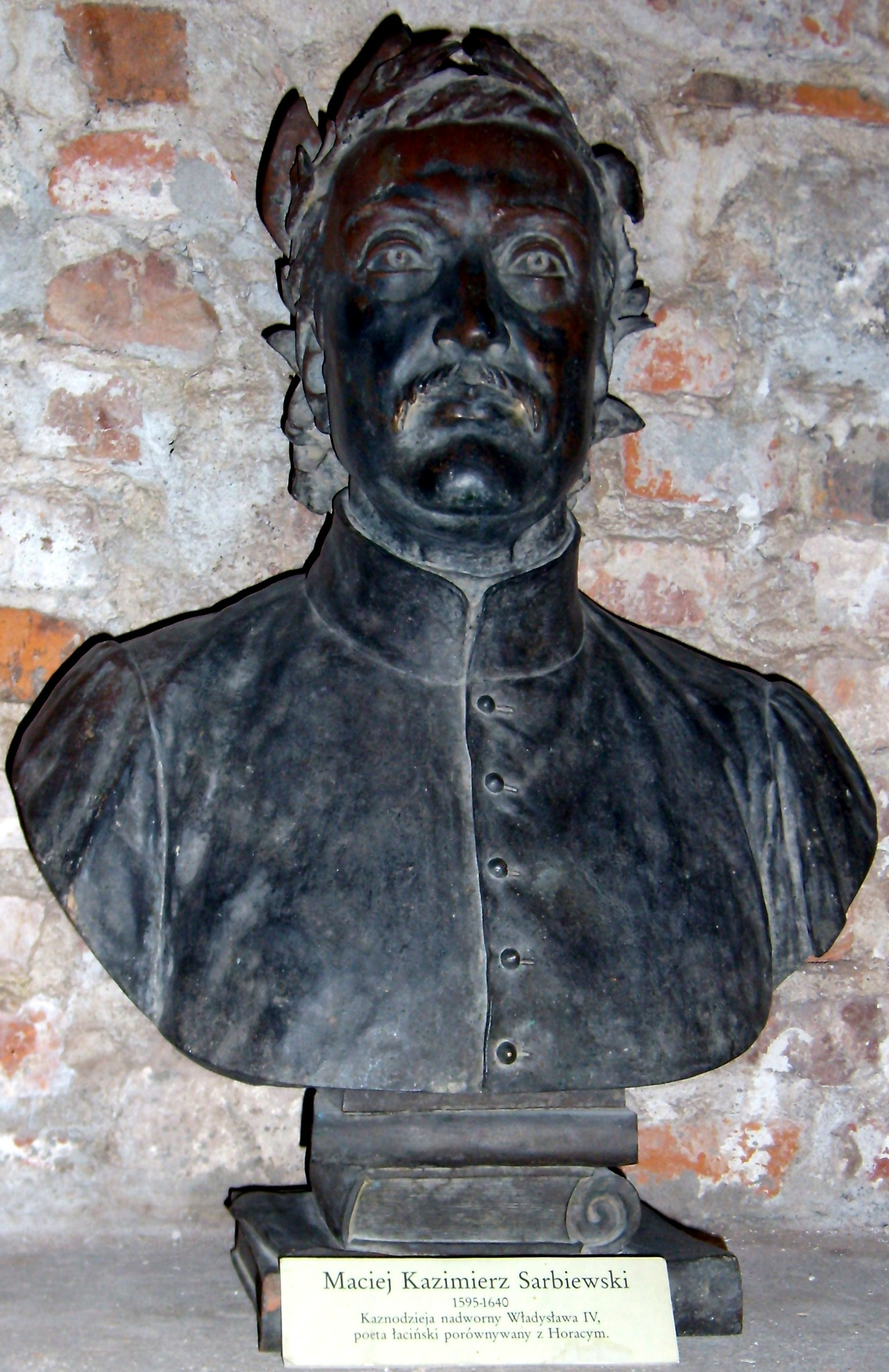
- Bust of Maciej Kazimierz Sarbiewski by Jan Kryński. Before 1885
- Born: 24 February 1595; Sarbiewo, Masovian Voivodeship
- Died: 2 April 1640; Warsaw
- Resting place: Powązki Cemetery
- Education: Jesuit college in Pułtusk
- Occupations: Poet, writer, university teacher
- Employer: Vilnius University
- Movement: Baroque

Maciej Kazimierz Sarbiewski (in Latin, Matthiās Casimīrus Sarbievius; Lithuanian: Motiejus Kazimieras Sarbievijus; Sarbiewo, Poland, 24 February 1595 – 2 April 1640, Warsaw, Poland), was a Polish priest and poet, who lived for many years in the Grand Duchy of Lithuania and especially its capital, Vilnius. He is considered the most prominent Latin poet of 17th-century Europe, and a renowned theoretician of poetics.

== Life ==
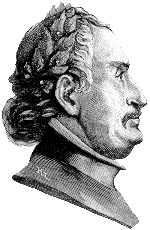
Sarbiewski

Maciej Kazimierz Sarbiewski was born in Sarbiewo, near Płońsk, in the Duchy of Masovia, on 24 February 1595. He studied at the Jesuit College in Pułtusk in 1606, then he entered the novitiate of the Jesuits at Vilnius on 25 July 1612; studied rhetoric and philosophy during 1614–17; taught grammar and humanities during 1617–18 and rhetoric at Polotsk during 1618–20; studied theology at Vilnius from 1620–22; was sent in 1622 to complete his theology at Rome, and was there ordained priest in 1623. He may have been laureated for his poetry by Pope Urban VIII.

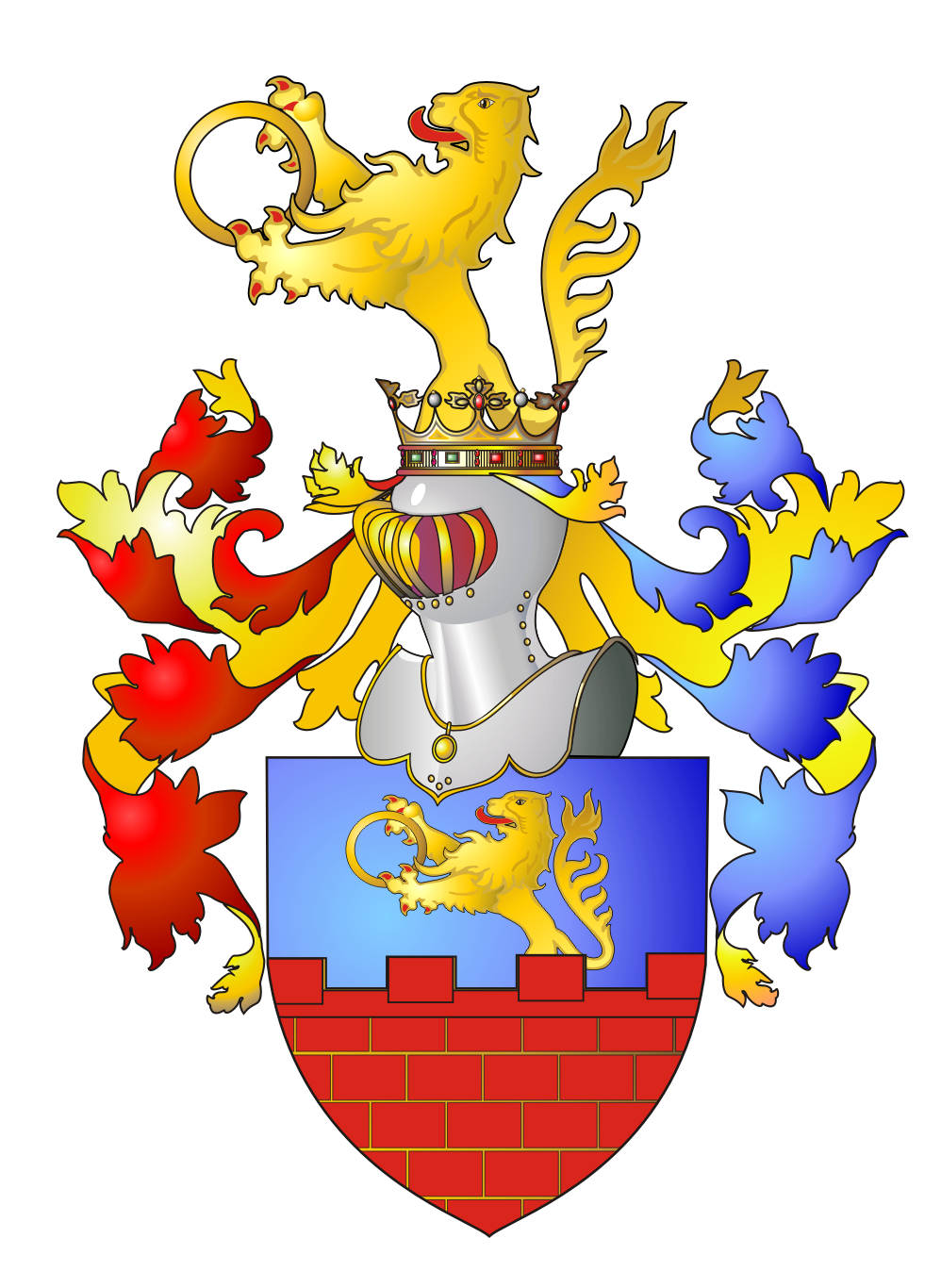
Coat of arms

Returning to the Polish–Lithuanian Commonwealth, Sarbiewski taught rhetoric, philosophy, and theology at Vilnius University from 1626 to 1635, was then made preacher to King Władysław, and was for four years companion in his travels. The fame of Sarbiewski is as wide as the world of letters. He knew music and the fine arts, but he was an expert at poetry versed in all the metres of the ancients. He was especially devoted to Horace, whose Odes he knew by heart. He also made the lyrical poetry of Pindar his own. To his familiarity with these great poets he added an industry which has given the splendid yield of his poetic works. The latest edition of these, printed at Stara Wieś in 1892, embraces four books of lyrics, a book of epodes, his posthumous Silviludia (Woodland Notes), and his book of epigrams. Of all these the lyrics furnish the best example of his qualities of mind and heart. All are pitched in a high key of thought, sentiment, or passion. His themes are for the most part love and devotion for Christ Crucified, for Our Blessed Lady, or friendship for a noble patron, such as Bishop Łubieński, Cardinal Francesco Barberini, nephew to Urban VIII, and that pontiff himself, whom he hailed as his Maecenas in several odes of exquisite finish. His noblest and most sustained efforts, however, are his patriotic odes upon the fatherland, the Knights of Poland, and kindred subjects. His tenderest pieces are those in praise of the rose, the violet, and the grasshopper, in which he rivals the grace and happy touch of Horace himself. He was crowned poeta laureatus by King Władysław IV Vasa. Urban VIII named him one of the revisers of the hymns of the Breviary, and he in particular is credited with having softened their previous ruggedness of metre. Some critics have urged that in his love of Horace he went so far as to become servile in imitating him, while others again have made a very virtue out of this close imitation. As a religious he was noted for his love of solitude, turning from the attractions of court life to solitude, prayer, and useful study and occupation.

== Works ==
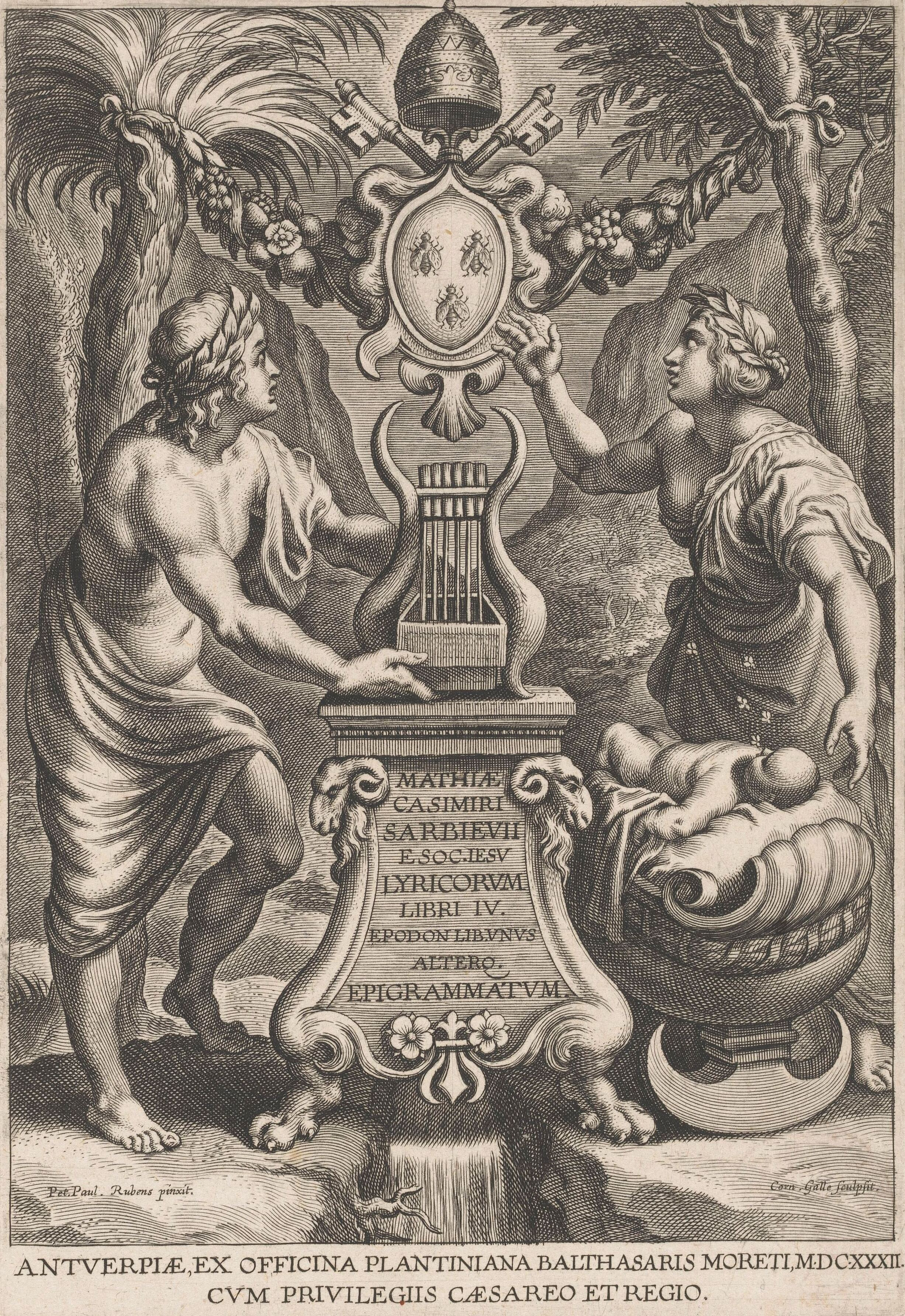
Frontispiece of Lyricorum Libri by Maciej Kazimierz Sarbiewski (Antwerp, Plantin Press, 1632)

His prose works are:

- De acuto et arguto liber unicus, sive Seneca et Martialis;
- Dii gentium, a speculative work on the ancient arts and sciences;
- De perfecta poesi libri quattuor;
- De Deo uno et trino tractatus;
- De angelis;
- De physico continuo;
- Memorabilia;
- scattered orations, sermons, and letters.

Maciej Kazimierz Sarbiewski was the first Polish poet to become widely celebrated abroad, and the most popular Polish author before Henryk Sienkiewicz. He became known as Horationis par (“the peer of Horace“), “the Sarmatian Horace” and “the last Latin poet.” His European fame came from his first collection of poetry, Lyricorum libri tres (Three Books of Lyrics). An expanded edition, Lyricorum libri IV (Four Books of Lyrics), was so successful in Europe that it was released in 60 editions in different countries. Select poems of Sarbiewski have been translated from the original Latin into other languages. But his poetical works, as a whole, have found few translators. In Polish may be counted no less than twenty-two versions of the poet; yet, only two of these are in any measure complete, the rest being translations of chosen odes. The most notable Polish version, embracing almost all the poems, is that of Ludwik Kondratowicz, who also wrote the life of Sarbiewski and translated his letters. There is also a copy in Polish of all the odes extant in manuscript at Stara Wieś, the work of some few Jesuit fathers of the province of White Russia. Detached translations also exist in Italian, Flemish, and Czech. In German there are at least eight or nine translations, principally from the odes, and also incomplete. The French versions are of the same character: they are three or four in number, choice odes or pieces taken from the Poems. Sarbiewski's poetry was extremely popular in Great Britain and was copiously translated into English. The English translations are fuller and more complete than any others. There are at least four that may be styled integral versions: Odes of Casimire by G.H., printed for Humphrey Moseley at the Princes Armes in St. Paul's Church Yard, 1646; Translations from Casimir with Poems, Odes, and specimens of Latin Prose, J. Kitchener (London and Bedford, 1821); Wood-notes, the Silviludia Poetica of M.C. Sarbievius with a translation in English verse, by R.C. Coxe (Newcastle-on-Tyne, 1848); Specimens of the Polish poets, with notes and observations on the Literature of Poland, by John Bowring (printed for the author, London, 1827). In 2008 a collected edition of English translations was published as Casimir Britannicus: English Translations, Paraphrases and Emulations of the Poetry of Maciej Kazimierz Sarbiewski, edited by Krzysztof Fordoński and Piotr Urbański. The collection was published again in 2010 in an expanded and corrected version.

== Gallery ==
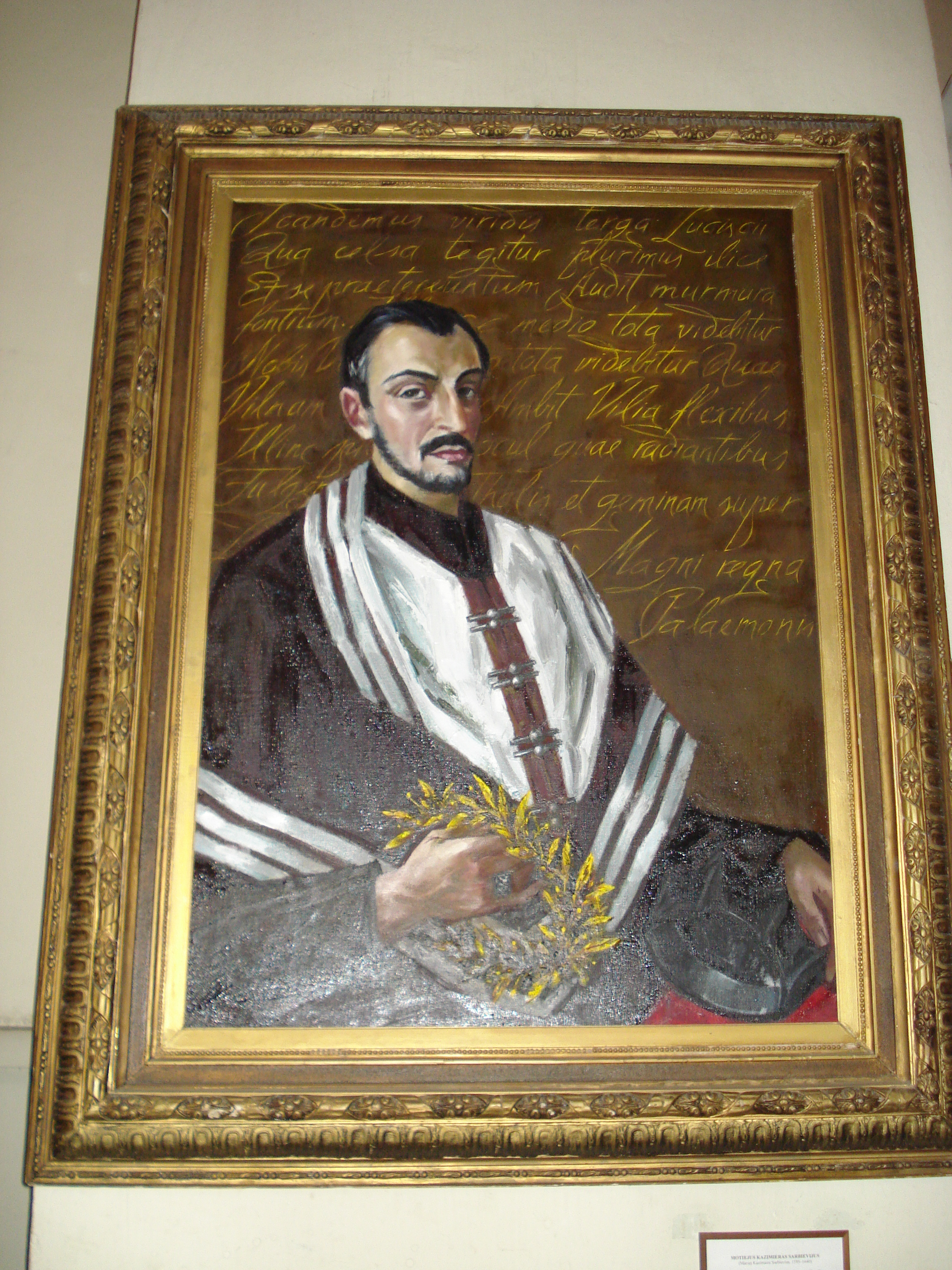
Sarbiewski portrait at the Church of St. Johns in Vilnius (by Sofija Veiverytė)

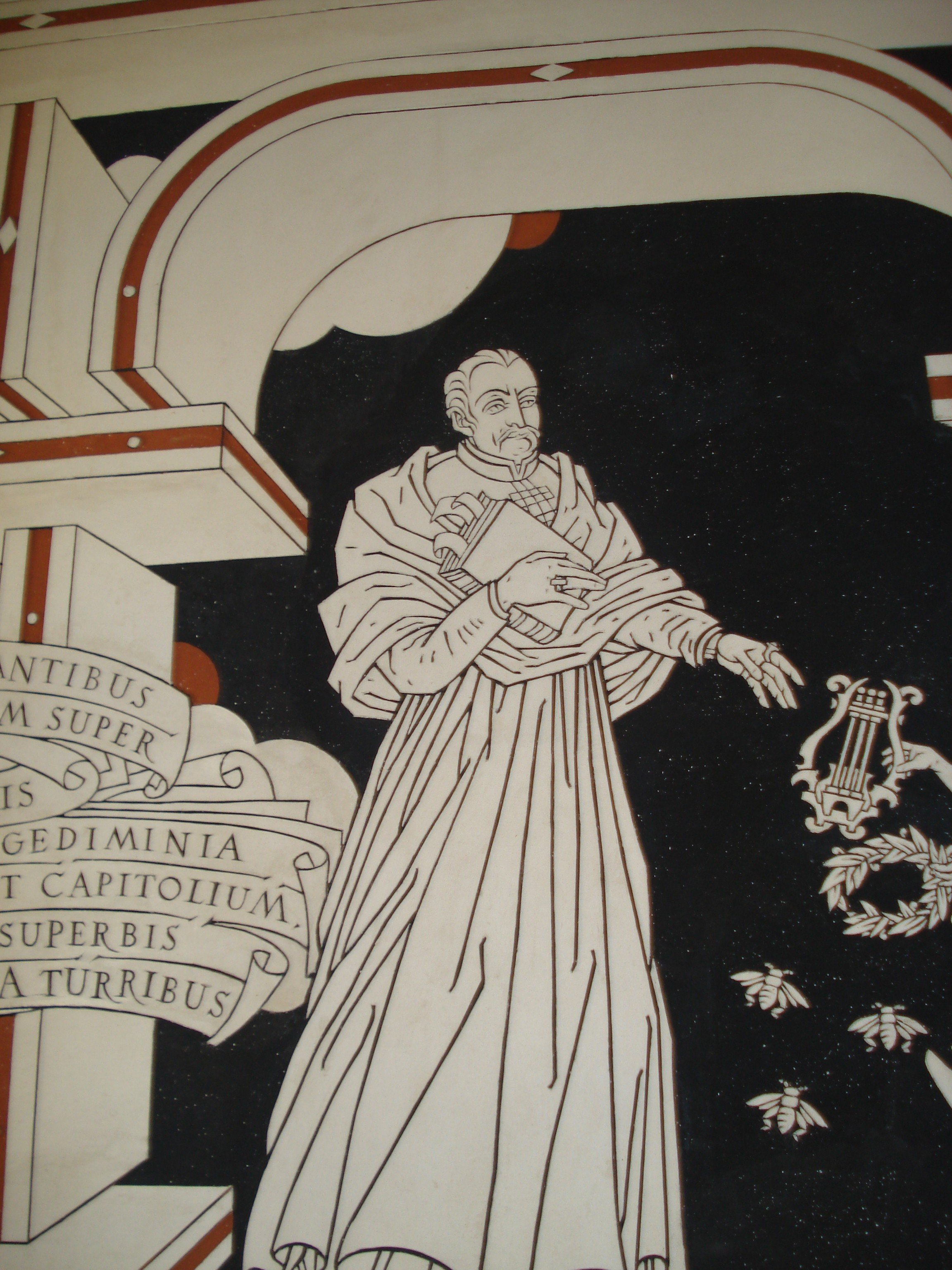
Scraffito painting at the Vilnius University Faculty of Philology (by Rimantas Gibavičius)

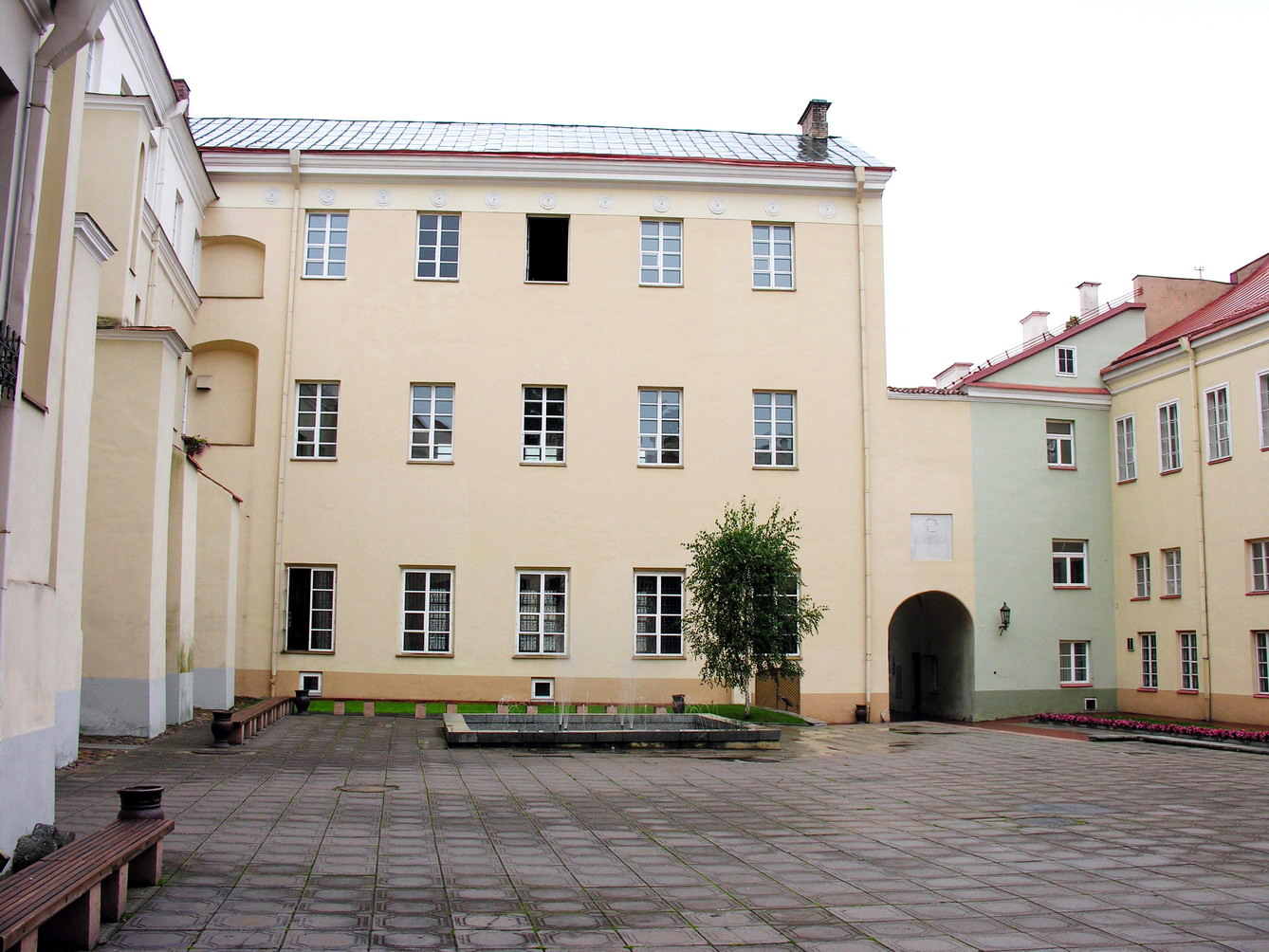
One of the Vilnius University courtyards is named after M.K. Sarbiewski

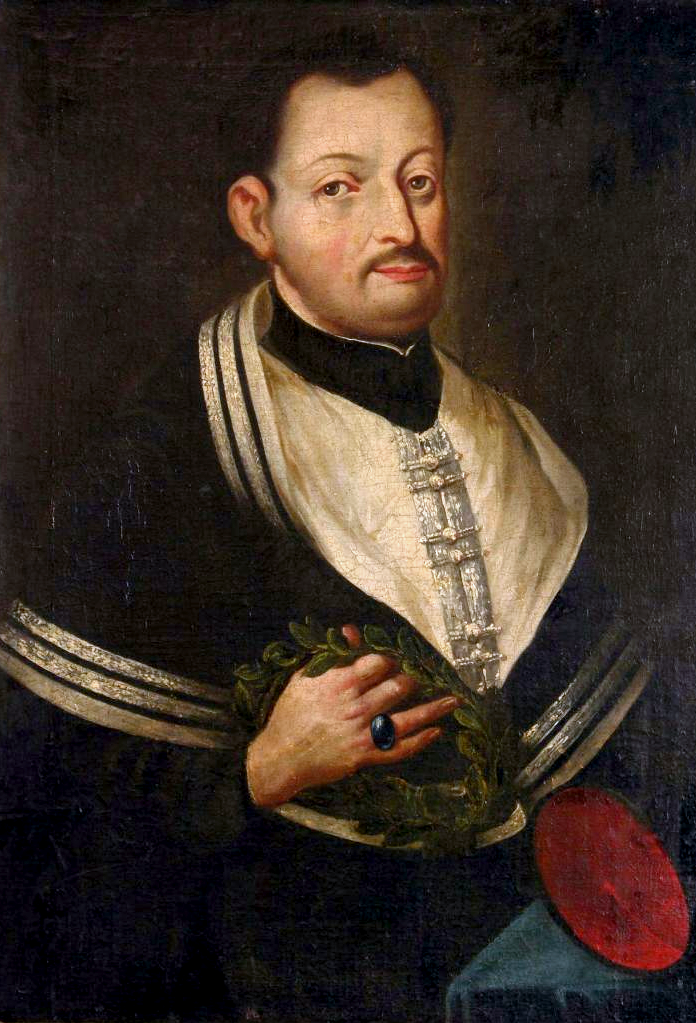
Józef Tadeusz Polkowski: Portrait of Maciej Kazimierz Sarbiewski

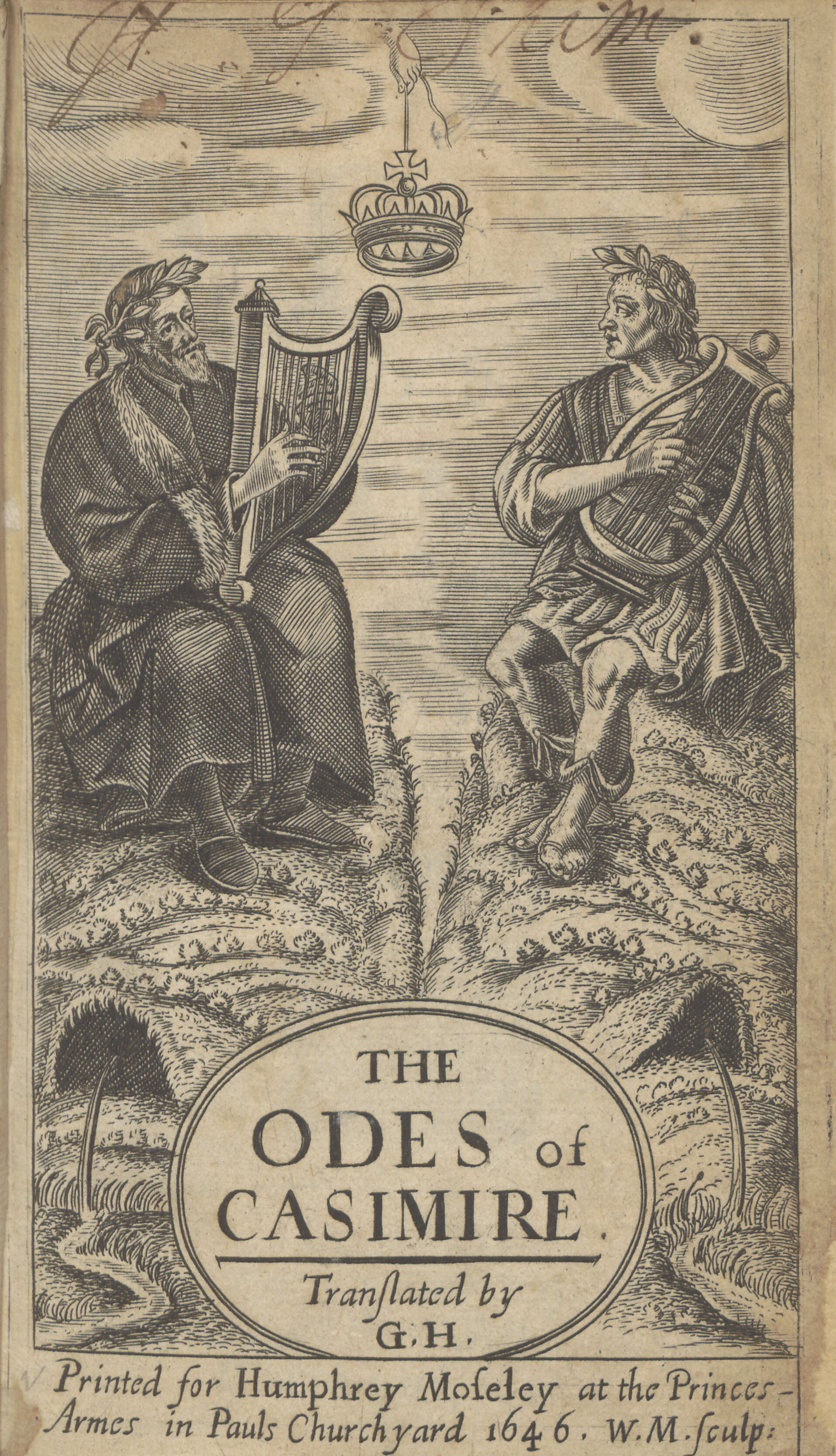
The odes of Casimire. London: printed by T. W. for Humphrey Moseley [...], 1646

== See also ==
- List of Poles
- History of the concept of creativity
