= Sokolniki Nowe =

- Village
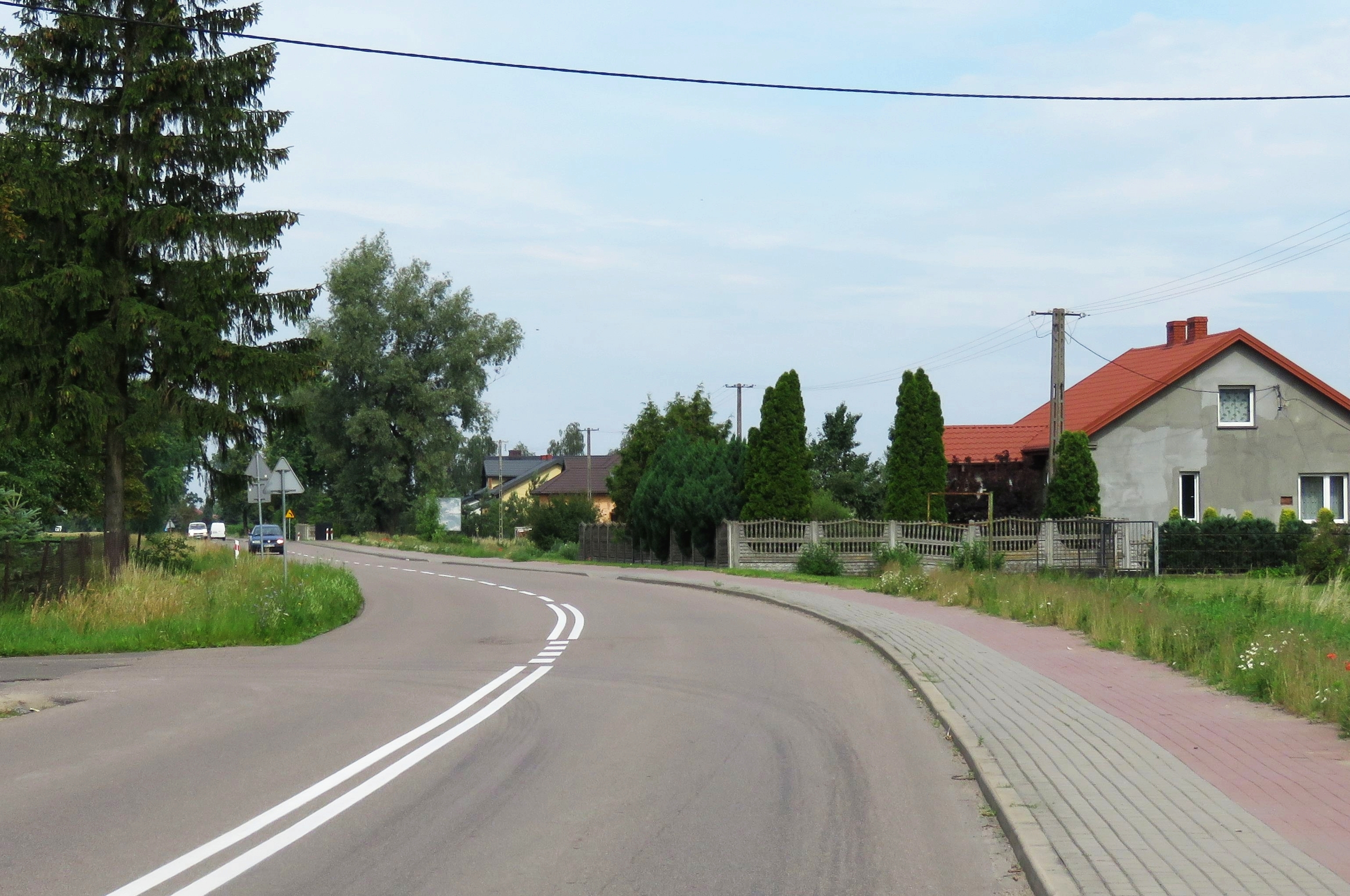

- Location within Poland
- Coordinates: 52°40′12″N 20°16′48″E
- Country: Poland
- Voivodeship: Masovian
- County: Płońsk
- Gmina: Baboszewo

Sokolniki Nowe [sɔkɔlˈniki ˈnɔvɛ] is a village in the administrative district of Gmina Baboszewo, within Płońsk County, Masovian Voivodeship, in east-central Poland.
