= Codex Ravennas 429 =

Manuscript preserving the eleven comedies of Aristophanes

Codex Ravennas 429 of Ravenna’s Classense Library, dated to the mid-tenth century, is the oldest manuscript to preserve all eleven extant comedies of Aristophanes.

About a quarter of the Lysistrata and the entirety of the Thesmophoriazusae survive the medieval period only in this codex and copies made from it.

In 1423, Giovanni Aurispa brought the codex to the humanist Niccolò de' Niccoli in Florence. Bernardo Giunti later used it for the first printed edition of Lysistrata and Thesmophoriazusae in 1516. The manuscript's provenance is unknown between then and 1712, when the abbot Pietro Canneti brought it from Pisa to the library of the Monastery of Classe in Ravenna.
