= Rybitwy, Masovian Voivodeship =

Rybitwy
- Village
- Location within Poland
- Coordinates: 52°46′N 20°17′E
- Country: Poland
- Voivodeship: Masovian
- County: Płońsk
- Gmina: Baboszewo

Rybitwy [rɨˈbitfɨ] is a village in the administrative district of Gmina Baboszewo, within Płońsk County, Masovian Voivodeship, in east-central Poland.
