= Goszczyce Poświętne =

- Village
- Location within Poland
- Coordinates: 52°45′N 20°21′E
- Country: Poland
- Voivodeship: Masovian
- County: Płońsk
- Gmina: Baboszewo

Goszczyce Poświętne [ɡɔʂˈt͡ʂɨt͡sɛ pɔɕˈfjɛntnɛ] is a village in the administrative district of Gmina Baboszewo, within Płońsk County, Masovian Voivodeship, in east-central Poland.
