= Cieszkowo-Kolonia =

- Village
- Location within Poland
- Coordinates: 52°43′01″N 20°14′12″E
- Country: Poland
- Voivodeship: Masovian
- County: Płońsk
- Gmina: Baboszewo

Cieszkowo-Kolonia [t͡ɕɛʂˈkɔvɔ kɔˈlɔɲa] is a village in the administrative district of Gmina Baboszewo, within Płońsk County, Masovian Voivodeship, in east-central Poland.
