= Pawłowo, Płońsk County =

Pawłowo
- Village
- Location within Poland
- Coordinates: 52°44′20″N 20°19′08″E
- Country: Poland
- Voivodeship: Masovian
- County: Płońsk
- Gmina: Baboszewo

Pawłowo [paˈvwɔvɔ] is a village in the administrative district of Gmina Baboszewo, within Płońsk County, Masovian Voivodeship, in east-central Poland.
