= Sarbiewo, Masovian Voivodeship =

Sarbiewo
- Village
- Location within Poland
- Coordinates: 52°41′57″N 20°21′22″E
- Country: Poland
- Voivodeship: Masovian
- County: Płońsk
- Gmina: Baboszewo
- Population: 200

Sarbiewo [sarˈbjɛvɔ] is a village in the administrative district of Gmina Baboszewo, within Płońsk County, Masovian Voivodeship, in east-central Poland.

Maciej Kazimierz Sarbiewski, a Polish author and Latin poet was born here in 1595.

The festival of poetry titled International Days of Maciej Kazimierz Sarbiewski takes places in Sarbiewo.
