= Dłużniewo, Masovian Voivodeship =

Dłużniewo
- Village
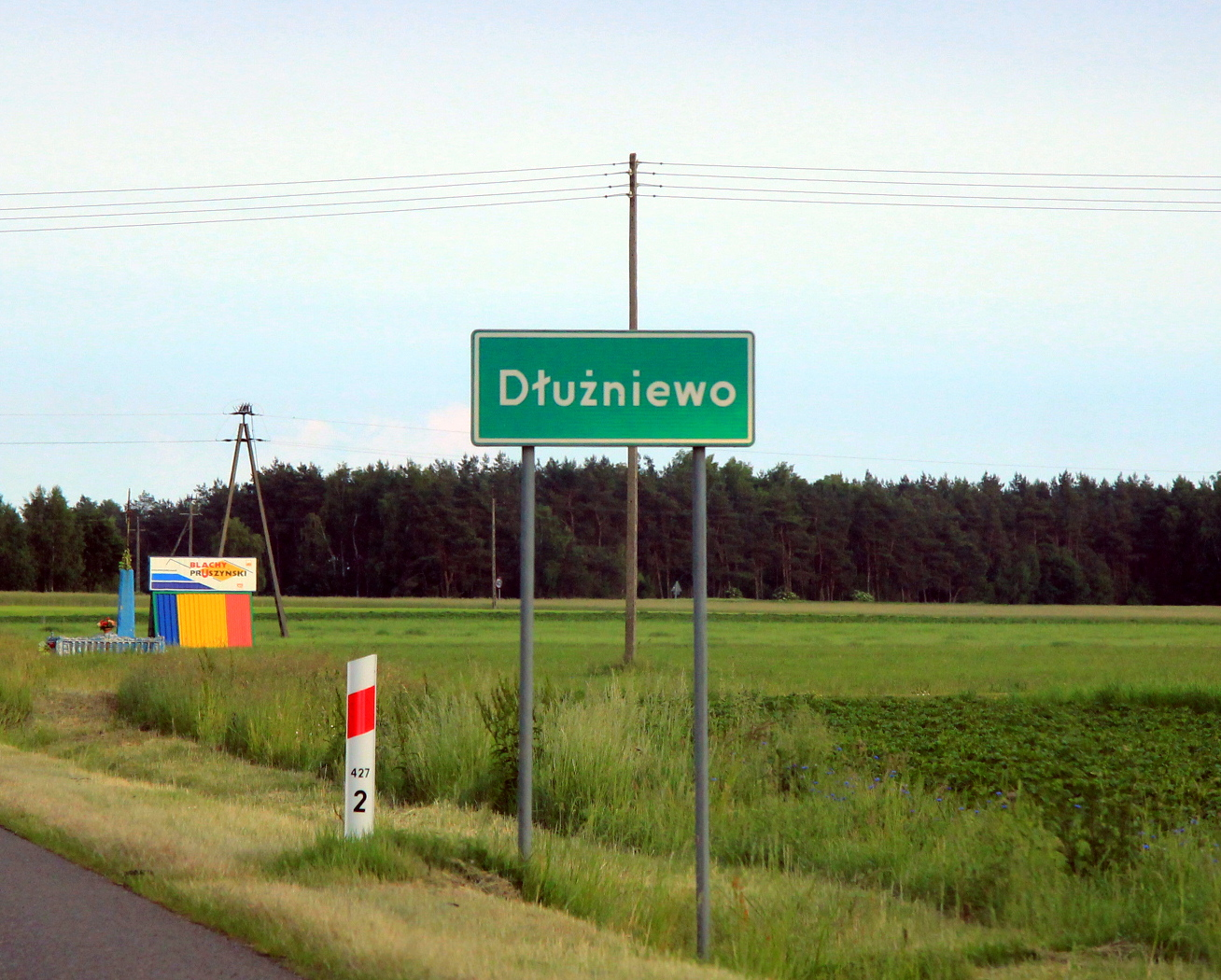

- Location within Poland
- Coordinates: 52°43′N 20°20′E
- Country: Poland
- Voivodeship: Masovian
- County: Płońsk
- Gmina: Baboszewo

Dłużniewo [dwuʐˈɲɛvɔ] is a village in the administrative district of Gmina Baboszewo, within Płońsk County, Masovian Voivodeship, in east-central Poland.
