= Baboszewo =

- Village
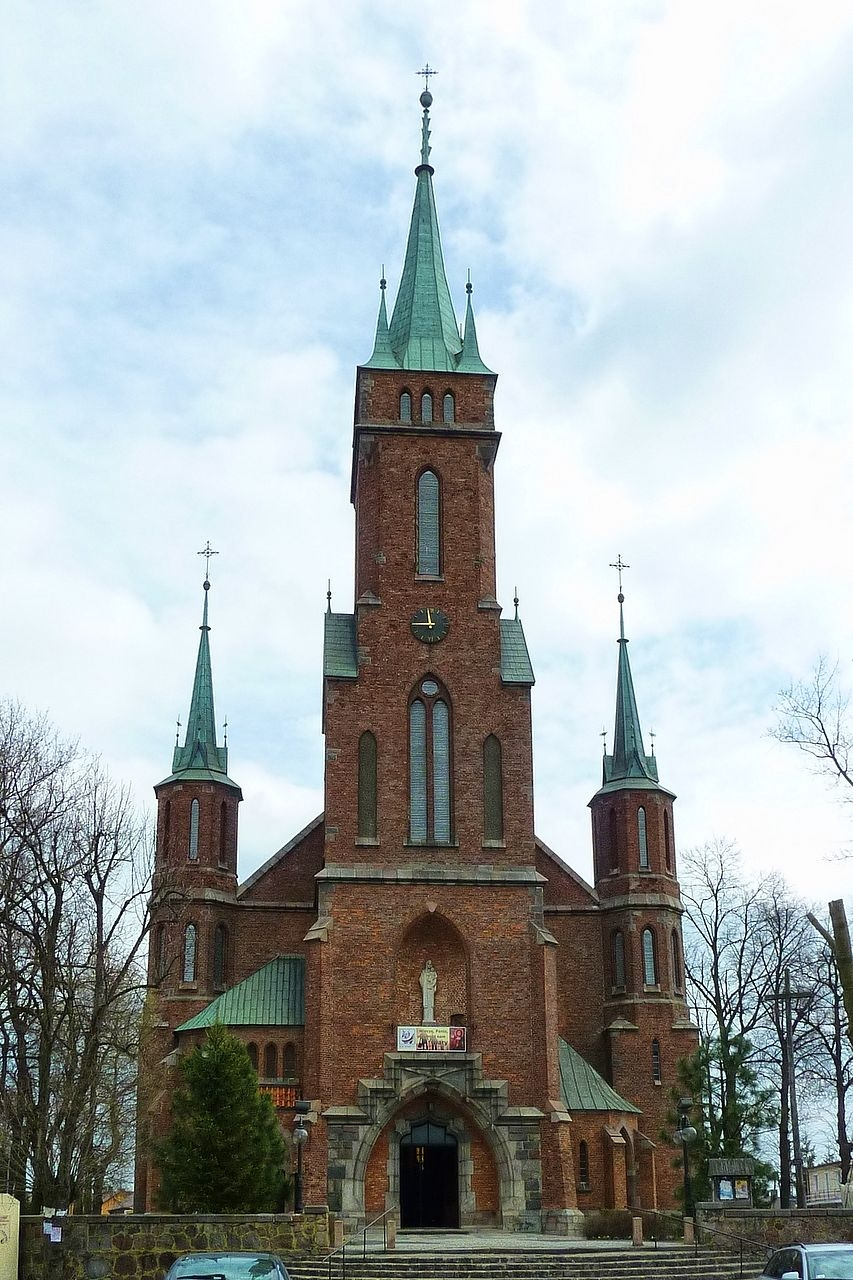
- Church of Our Lady of Częstochowa

- Location within Poland
- Coordinates: 52°40′53″N 20°15′30″E
- Country: Poland
- Voivodeship: Masovian
- County: Płońsk
- Gmina: Baboszewo

Population
  - Total: 8,000

Baboszewo [babɔˈʂɛvɔ] is a village in Płońsk County, Masovian Voivodeship, in east-central Poland. It is the seat of the gmina (administrative district) called Gmina Baboszewo.
