= Jarocin, Masovian Voivodeship =

Jarocin
- Village
- Location within Poland
- Coordinates: 52°40′51″N 20°20′28″E
- Country: Poland
- Voivodeship: Masovian
- County: Płońsk
- Gmina: Baboszewo

Jarocin [jaˈrɔt͡ɕin] is a village in the administrative district of Gmina Baboszewo, within Płońsk County, Masovian Voivodeship, in east-central Poland.
