= Biblioteca Classense =

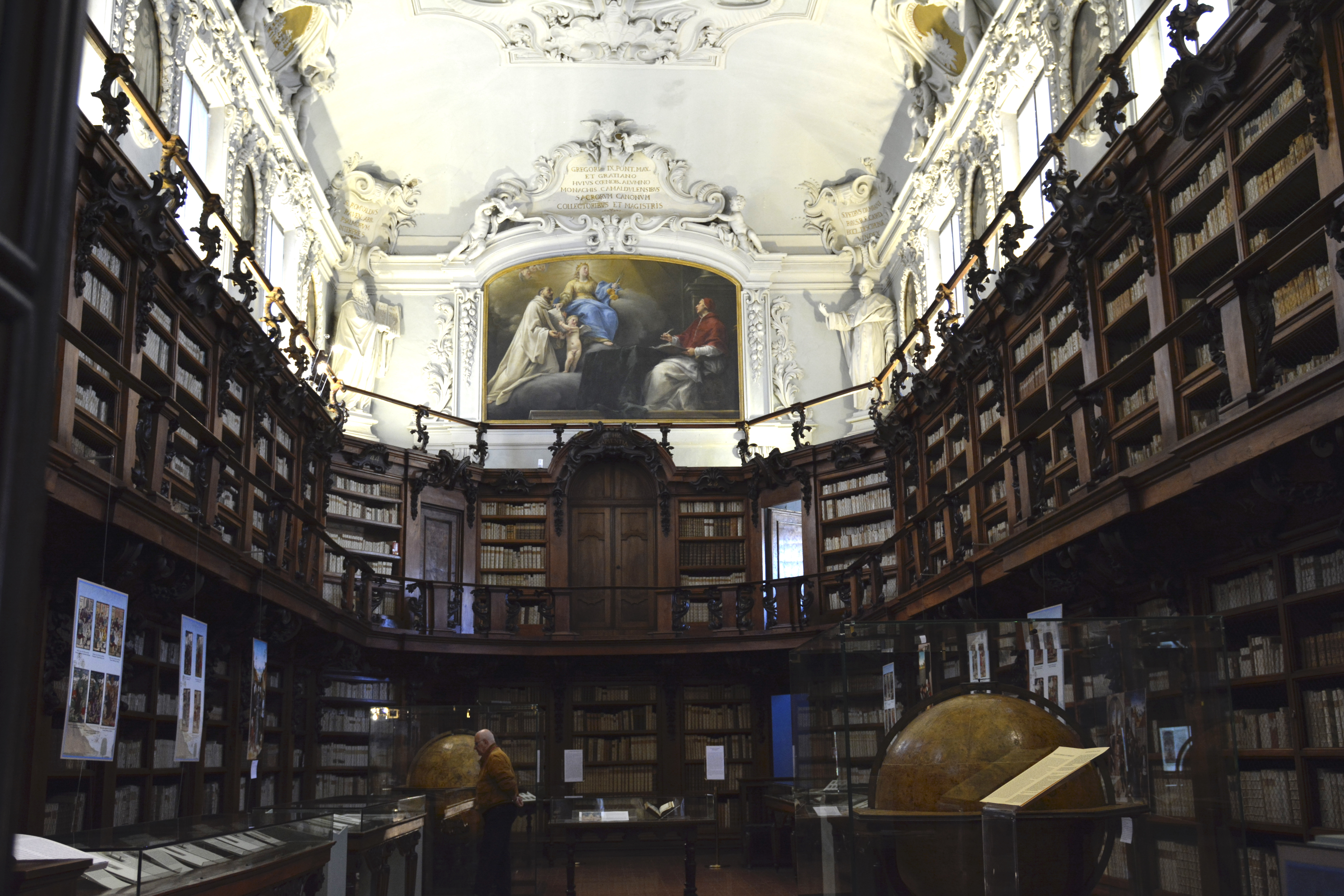
Aula Magna of Biblioteca Classense in Ravenna (photo 2016)

The Biblioteca Classense is the public library of Ravenna, Italy.

In 1803, with the Napoleonic suppression of monasteries and religious institutions, a library was created to harbor the confiscated books. They were housed in the library of the Camaldolese Monastery, which had been founded in the 17th century by the Abbott Pietro Canneti with books moved here from the abbey adjacent to Sant'Apollinare in Classe. The collection was expanded with donation from the architect Camillo Morigia (1743-1795) and the art critic Corrado Ricci (1858-1934).

It now includes manuscript codices, incunabula, prints, musical works, and numerous artworks and books.

The library has a large collection of editions of the works related to Dante Alighieri.

== See also ==
- Codex Ravennas 429

== Bibliography ==
in English

- Paul Oskar Kristeller (1998). "Ravenna". Iter Italicum: a finding list of uncatalogued or incompletely catalogued humanistic manuscripts of the Renaissance in Italian and other libraries. Vol. 2: Italy O-V (3rd ed.). Brill. pp. 80+. ISBN 9004012559.

in Italian

- "Biblioteca Classense", Enciclopedia Italiana (in Italian), 1931
