= Lutomierzyn =

- Village
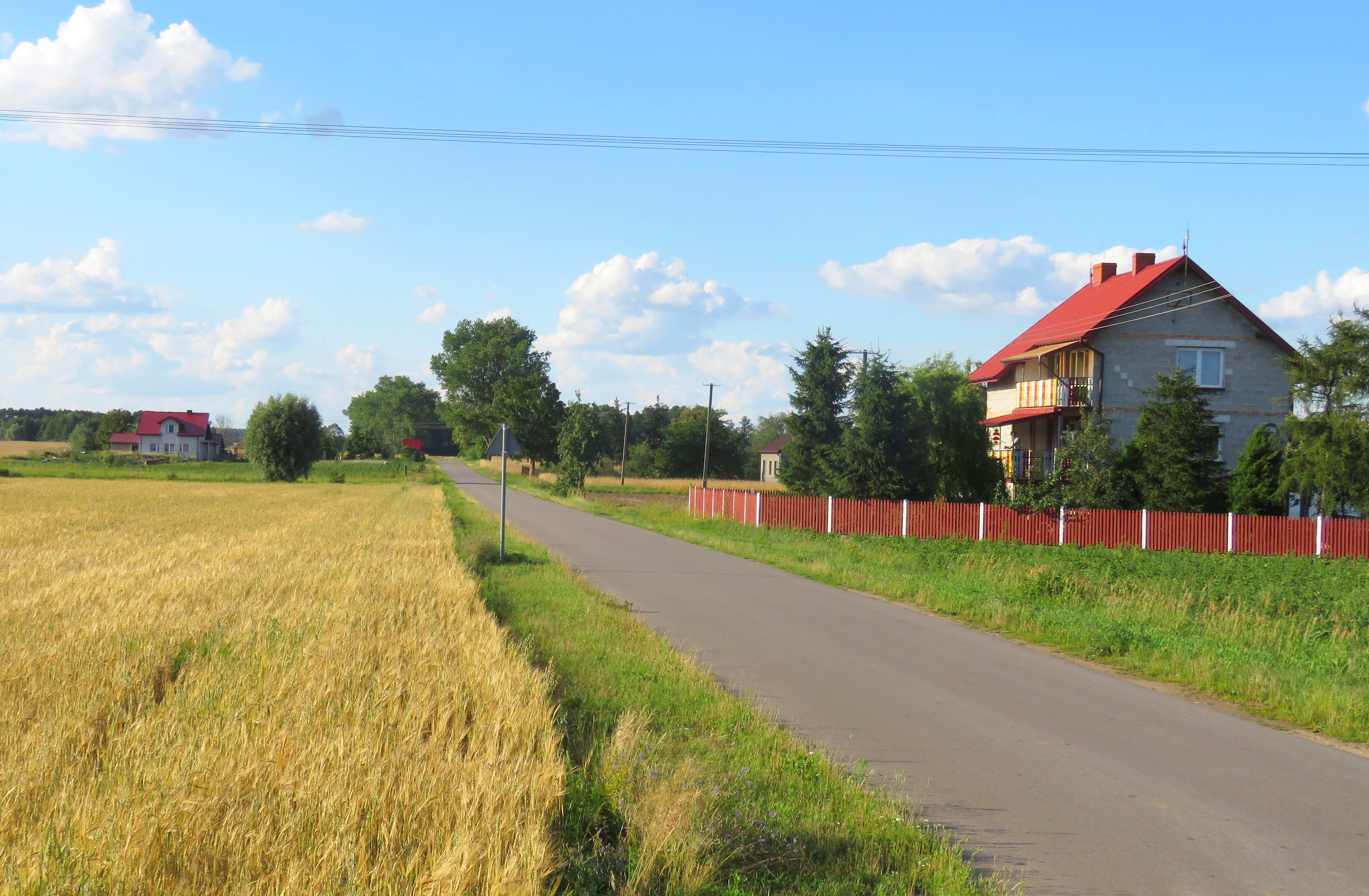

- Location within Poland
- Coordinates: 52°42′56″N 20°11′29″E
- Country: Poland
- Voivodeship: Masovian
- County: Płońsk
- Gmina: Baboszewo

Lutomierzyn [lutɔˈmjɛʐɨn] is a village in the administrative district of Gmina Baboszewo, within Płońsk County, Masovian Voivodeship, in east-central Poland.
