= Cywiny-Dynguny =

- Village
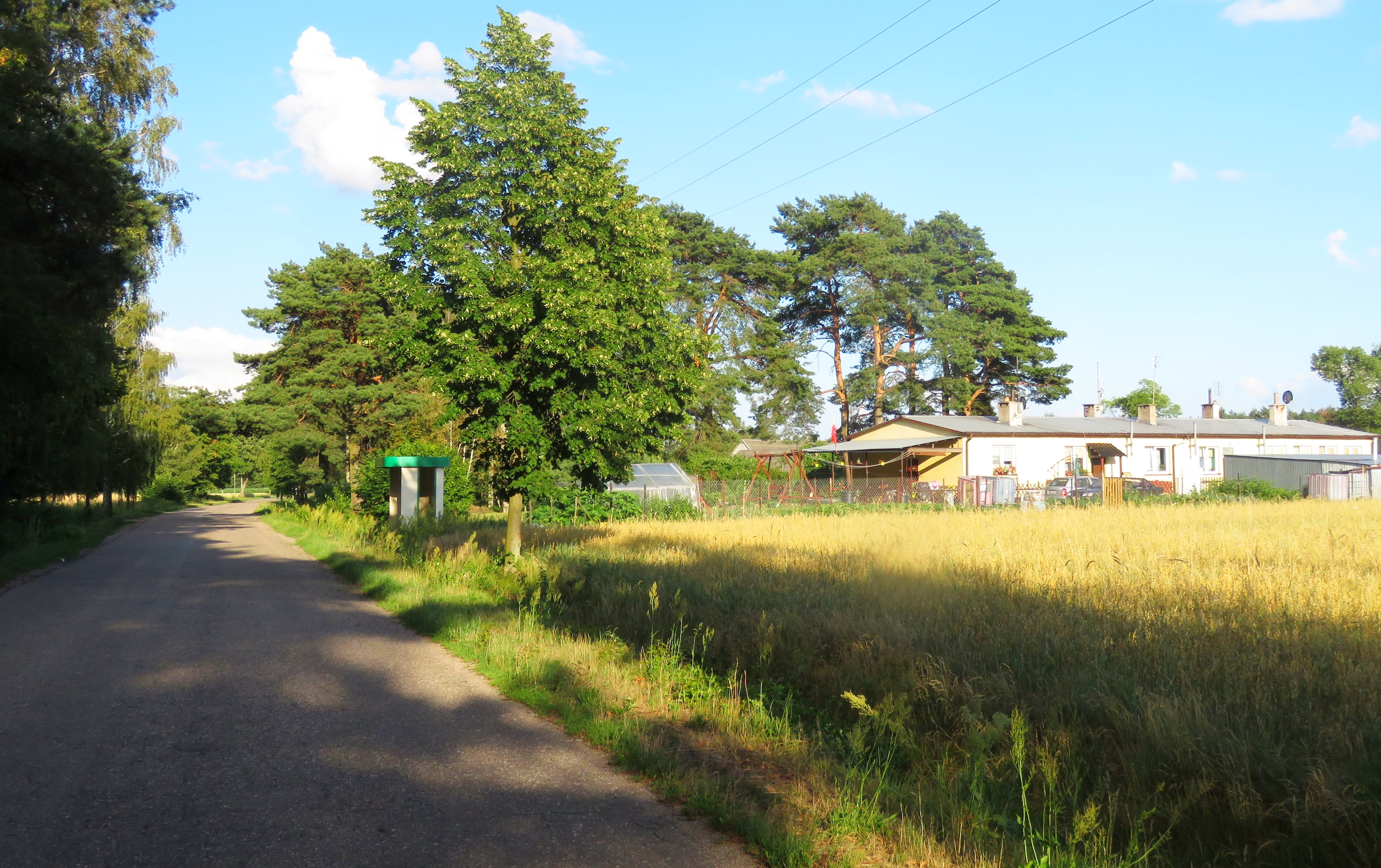

- Location within Poland
- Coordinates: 52°42′25″N 20°10′23″E
- Country: Poland
- Voivodeship: Masovian
- County: Płońsk
- Gmina: Baboszewo

Cywiny-Dynguny [t͡sɨˈvinɨ dɨnˈɡunɨ] is a village in the administrative district of Gmina Baboszewo, within Płońsk County, Masovian Voivodeship, in east-central Poland.
