= Brzeście, Masovian Voivodeship =

Brzeście
- Village
- Location within Poland
- Coordinates: 52°40′N 20°15′E
- Country: Poland
- Voivodeship: Masovian
- County: Płońsk
- Gmina: Baboszewo

Brzeście [ˈbʐɛɕt͡ɕɛ] is a village in the administrative district of Gmina Baboszewo, within Płońsk County, Masovian Voivodeship, in east-central Poland.
