= Niedarzyn, Masovian Voivodeship =

Niedarzyn
- Village
- Location within Poland
- Coordinates: 52°44′N 20°14′E
- Country: Poland
- Voivodeship: Masovian
- County: Płońsk
- Gmina: Baboszewo
- Population (approx.): 200

Niedarzyn [ɲɛˈdaʐɨn] is a village in the administrative district of Gmina Baboszewo, within Płońsk County, Masovian Voivodeship, in east-central Poland.
