= Korzybie, Płońsk County =

Korzybie
- Village
- Location within Poland
- Coordinates: 52°39′N 20°16′E
- Country: Poland
- Voivodeship: Masovian
- County: Płońsk
- Gmina: Baboszewo

Korzybie [kɔˈʐɨbjɛ] is a village in the administrative district of Gmina Baboszewo, within Płońsk County, Masovian Voivodeship, in east-central Poland.
