= Śródborze, Płońsk County =

Śródborze
- Village
- Location within Poland
- Coordinates: 52°45′23″N 20°15′18″E
- Country: Poland
- Voivodeship: Masovian
- County: Płońsk
- Gmina: Baboszewo
- Time zone: UTC+1 (CET)
  - Summer (DST): UTC+2 (CEST)

Śródborze [ɕrudˈbɔʐɛ] is a village in the administrative district of Gmina Baboszewo, within Płońsk County, Masovian Voivodeship, in north-central Poland.

Six Polish citizens were murdered by Nazi Germany in the village during World War II.
