= Budy Radzymińskie =

- Village
- Location within Poland
- Coordinates: 52°44′N 20°22′E
- Country: Poland
- Voivodeship: Masovian
- County: Płońsk
- Gmina: Baboszewo

Budy Radzymińskie [ˈbudɨ rad͡zɨˈmiɲskʲɛ] is a village in the administrative district of Gmina Baboszewo, within Płońsk County, Masovian Voivodeship, in east-central Poland.
