= Kowale, Masovian Voivodeship =

Kowale
- Village
- Location within Poland
- Coordinates: 52°40′38″N 20°11′56″E
- Country: Poland
- Voivodeship: Masovian
- County: Płońsk
- Gmina: Baboszewo

Kowale [kɔˈvalɛ] is a village in the administrative district of Gmina Baboszewo, within Płońsk County, Masovian Voivodeship, in east-central Poland.
