= Giovanni Aurispa =

Italian historian, priest and humanist

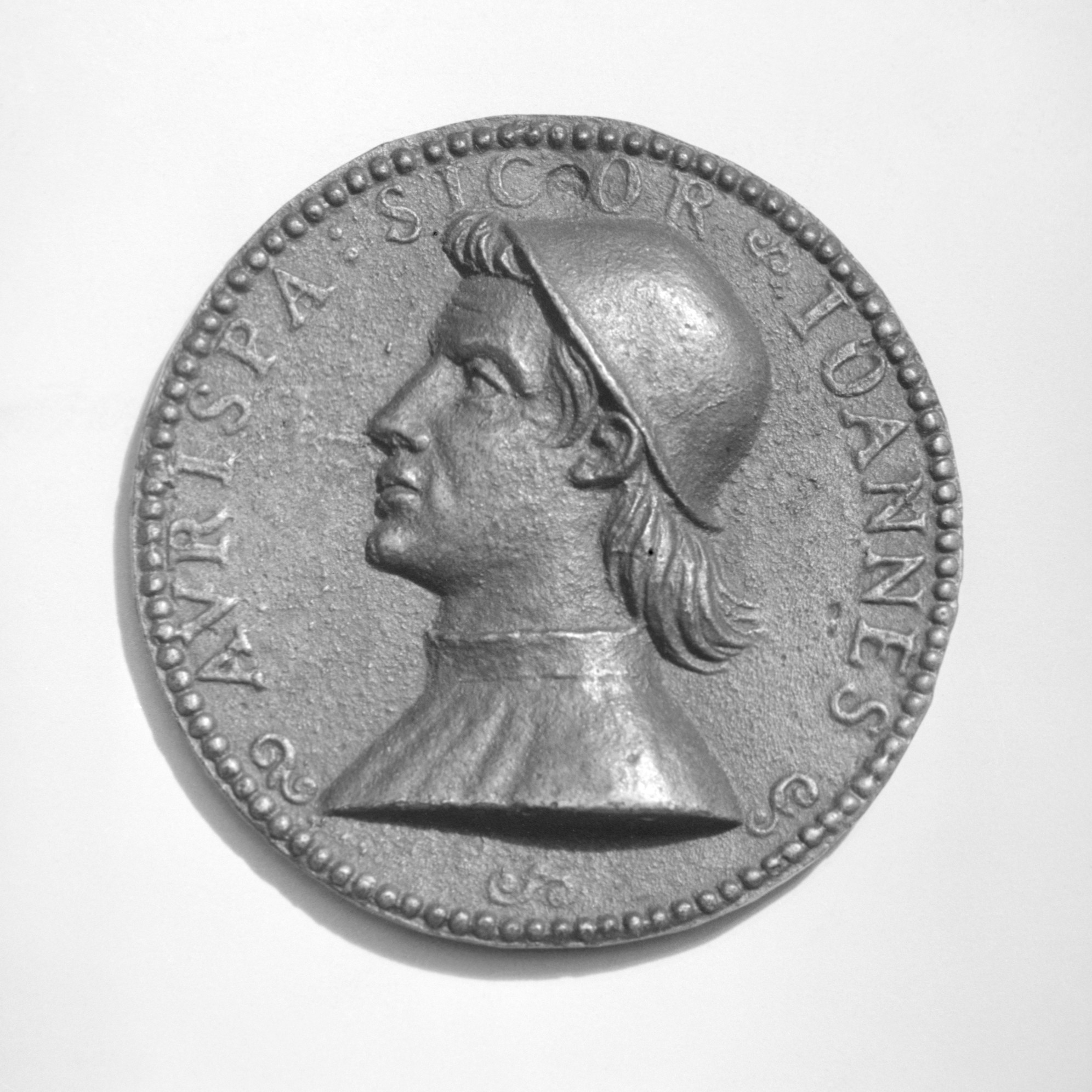
Giovanni Aurispa, as portrayed on a bronze medal.

Giovanni Aurispa Piciunerio (or Piciuneri) (June/July 1376 – c. 25 May 1459) was an Italian historian and savant of the 15th century. He is remembered in particular as a promoter of the revival of the study of Greek in Italy. It is to Aurispa that the world is indebted for preserving the greater part of our knowledge of the Greek classics.

== Life ==
Aurispa was born at Noto in Sicily in 1376. A scholarship from the King of Sicily enabled him to study at Bologna from 1404 to 1410. Soon after, in 1413–14, he went to Greece as a private tutor for the sons of a Genoese merchant, Racanelli, and settled on the island of Chios. Here he learned Greek and began to collect books, including a Sophocles and a Euripides. He also obtained a number of Greek texts, including a work by Thucydides which he later sold to Niccolo Niccoli in 1417. He returned to Italy in 1414, setting in Savona, where he supported himself by teaching Greek and by selling the works he had collected in Greece.

In 1418, Aurispa visited Constantinople, where he remained for some years, perfecting his knowledge of Greek and searching for manuscripts. He worked so hard at this that he later wrote that he had been denounced to the Byzantine emperor for buying all the sacred books in the city. Upon his return from that trip he went to Florence where he entered the service of the papal court, which was then in residence in that city. He moved to Rome the following year when the court transferred there. It was there that he taught one of his most famous students, Lorenzo Valla, later himself a noted classical scholar.

In 1421 Aurispa was sent by Pope Martin V to act as the translator for the Marquis Gianfrancesco Gonzaga on a diplomatic mission to the Byzantine emperor, Manuel Paleologos. After their arrival, he gained the favor of the emperor's son and successor, John VIII Palaiologos, who took him on as his own secretary. Two years later, he accompanied his Byzantine employer on a mission to the courts of Europe. He traveled with this mission as far as Venice, where he left the imperial service.

On 15 December 1423 Aurispa arrived in Venice with the largest and finest collection of Greek texts to reach the west prior to those brought by Bessarion. In reply to a letter from the Camaldolese prior and scholar St. Ambrose Traversari, he says that he brought back 238 manuscripts. These contained all of Plato, all of Plotinus, all of Proclus, much of Iamblichus, many of the Greek poets, including Pindar, and a great deal of Greek history, including volumes of Procopius and Xenophon which had been given to him by the emperor. Also, he had the poems of Callimachus and Oppian, and the Orphic verses; and the historical works of Dio Cassius, Diodorus Siculus, and Arrian. Most of the works were hitherto unknown in the West.

Further items included the oldest manuscript of Athenaeus; a 10th-century codex containing seven plays by Sophocles and six by Aeschylus—the only manuscript in the world of these, plus the Argonautica of Apollonius of Rhodes; the Iliad, works by Demosthenes, and many more. A work by Herodotus was also among the collection; also the Geography of Strabo. The texts are all listed in the letter to Traversari.

The only patristic text Aurispa had brought from Greece was a volume containing about 200 letters of St. Gregory Nazianzen. In a letter to Traversari, he explained:

I have not brought any sacred volumes from Greece except the letters of Gregory, which are, I believe, 200. This book is in faultless condition, and all the pages can be read, but its beauty is hardly such as to invite the reluctant reader. Long ago I sent from Constantinople to Sicily a good number of very choice sacred volumes, for I admit frankly that they were less precious to me, and a number of malicious persons often brought charges to the Greek emperor, accusing me of pillaging the city of sacred books. With regard to the heathen books, it seemed to them not such a great crime.

Back in Venice, Aurispa is said to have been obliged to pawn his treasures for 50 gold florins to provide for the shipping costs. Traversari wrote to Lorenzo de' Medici on his behalf, who made a loan to Aurispa to redeem the manuscripts. Traversari also arranged to exchange Niccolo's transcriptions of newly discovered texts by Cicero for Aurispa's transcriptions of Aristotle's Rhetoric and Eudemian Ethics.

In 1424 Aurispa went to Bologna, where he became professor of Greek at the university, but this was not a success. At the urging of Traversari, from 1425 to 1427 he held the prestigious Chair of Greek studies in Florence. This ensured that his collection was copied widely among the humanists.

Quarrels at Florence led Aurispa to leave Florence in late 1427 or early 1428 and to move to Ferrara, where, on the recommendation of his friend, the scholar Guarino of Verona, he was appointed tutor to Meliaduse d'Este, the illegitimate son of Niccolò III d'Este, Marquis of Ferrara. He taught the classics there, took Holy Orders and obtained preferment in the Church. King Alfonso of Naples asked him through his friend Panormita to move there, but he declined.

By 1430 Aurispa had managed to recover a bundle of his manuscripts from Sicily. These included a volume of lives of the saints, including one of St. Gregory Nazianzen, as well as one of the sermons of St. John Chrysostom, a Psalter, a volume of the Gospels, and the comedies of Aristophanes. The remainder of his manuscripts seem to have never been returned to him. In 1433 he accompanied his student Meliaduse to the Council of Basel, taking a lengthy journey along the Rhine, visiting Mainz, Cologne and Aachen, in the course of which he discovered new Latin codices.

In 1438, when the council was transferred to Ferrara, Aurispa attracted the attention of Pope Eugene IV, who appointed him an Apostolic Secretary, and so he moved to Rome. He held a similar position under Pope Nicholas V, who bestowed two lucrative commendatory abbacies on him. He seems also to have been made a papal poet laureate.

Aurispa returned to Ferrara in 1450 and died there in 1459, at the age of 83.

== Legacy ==
Considering his long life and reputation, Aurispa produced little: Latin translations of the commentary of Hierocles on the golden verses of Pythagoras (1474) and of Philisci Consolatoria ad Ciceronem from Dio Cassius (not published until 1510); and, according to Gesner, a translation of the works of Archimedes.

Aurispa's reputation rests upon the extensive collection of manuscripts copied and distributed by him, and his persistent efforts to revive and promote the study of ancient literature.

== See also ==
- Codex Ravennas 429
