= Gmina Baboszewo =

Gmina Baboszewo Baboszewo Commune
- Gmina
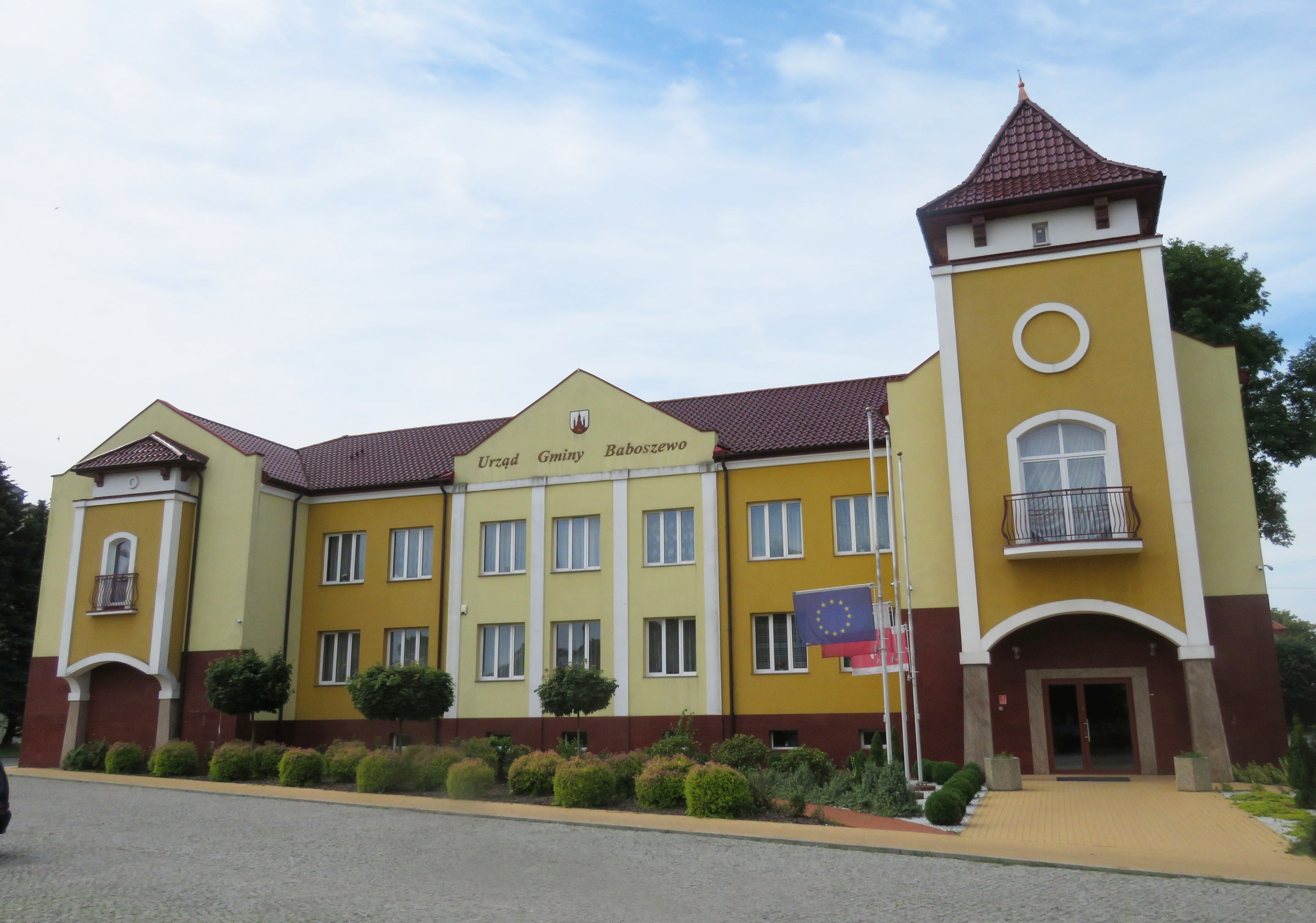
- Municipal office

- Flag Coat of arms
- Interactive map of Gmina Baboszewo
- Coordinates (Baboszewo): 52°41′N 20°16′E
- Country: Poland
- Voivodeship: Masovian
- County: Płońsk
- Seat: Baboszewo

Area
  - Total: 162.35 km^{2} (62.68 sq mi)

Population (2013)
  - Total: 8,138
  - Density: 50.13/km^{2} (129.8/sq mi)
- Website: gminababoszewo.pl

Gmina Baboszewo is a rural gmina (administrative district) in Płońsk County, Masovian Voivodeship, in east-central Poland. Its seat is the village of Baboszewo, which lies approximately 10 kilometres (6 mi) north-west of Płońsk and 72 km (45 mi) north-west of Warsaw.

The gmina covers an area of 162.35 square kilometres (62.7 sq mi), and as of 2006 its total population is 7,999 (8,138 in 2013).

== Villages ==
Gmina Baboszewo contains the villages and settlements of:

- Baboszewo
- Bożewo
- Brzeście
- Brzeście Małe
- Brzeście Nowe
- Budy Radzymińskie
- Cieszkowo Nowe
- Cieszkowo Stare
- Cieszkowo-Kolonia
- Cywiny Wojskie
- Cywiny-Dynguny
- Dłużniewo
- Dramin
- Dziektarzewo
- Galomin
- Galominek
- Galominek Nowy
- Goszczyce Poświętne
- Goszczyce Średnie
- Jarocin
- Jesionka
- Kiełki
- Korzybie
- Kowale
- Krościn
- Kruszewie
- Lachówiec
- Lutomierzyn
- Mystkowo
- Niedarzyn
- Pawłowo
- Pieńki Rzewińskie
- Polesie
- Rybitwy
- Rzewin
- Sarbiewo
- Sokolniki Nowe
- Sokolniki Stare
- Śródborze
- Wola Dłużniewska
- Wola-Folwark
- Zbyszyno

== Neighbouring gminas ==
Gmina Baboszewo is bordered by the gminas of Dzierzążnia, Glinojeck, Płońsk, Raciąż, Sochocin and Staroźreby.
