= Galominek Nowy =

- Village
- Location within Poland
- Coordinates: 52°42′32″N 20°17′50″E
- Country: Poland
- Voivodeship: Masovian
- County: Płońsk
- Gmina: Baboszewo

Galominek Nowy [ɡalɔˈminɛk ˈnɔvɨ] is a village in the administrative district of Gmina Baboszewo, within Płońsk County, Masovian Voivodeship, in east-central Poland.
