= Brzeście Małe =

Village in Gmina Baboszewo, Poland

- Village
- Location within Poland
- Coordinates: 52°40′41″N 20°13′1″E
- Country: Poland
- Voivodeship: Masovian
- County: Płońsk
- Gmina: Baboszewo

Brzeście Małe [ˈbʐɛɕt͡ɕɛ ˈmawɛ] is a village in the administrative district of Gmina Baboszewo, within Płońsk County, Masovian Voivodeship, in east-central Poland.
