= Maria Maddalena Morelli =

Italian poet (1727–1800)

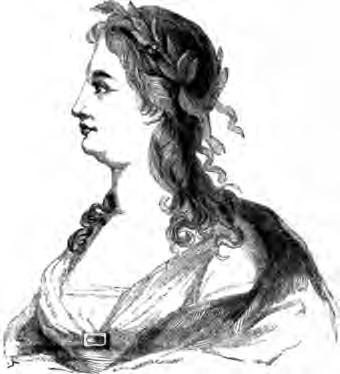
- Portrait printed in Sarah Josepha Hale's Woman's Record (1853)
- Born: 17 March 1727; Pistoia
- Died: 8 November 1800 (aged 73); Florence
- Writing career
- Pen name: Corilla Olimpica
- Notable awards: Laurea poetica (1776)

Maria Maddalena Morelli Fernandez (17 March 1727, Pistoia – 8 November 1800, Florence), also known by the Arcadian pseudonym Corilla Olimpica, was a Florentine Italian poet, improvisatrice, and musician. The official poetess to the grand ducal court in Florence (1765–1775), she won fame as the foremost female performer of the improvised poetry then popular in Italy, and was controversially crowned with the laurel wreath on the Roman Capitol in 1776, an event later fictionalised by Madame de Staël in Corinne, or Italy.
