= Jesionka, Płońsk County =

Jesionka
- Village
- Location within Poland
- Coordinates: 52°43′55″N 20°22′34″E
- Country: Poland
- Voivodeship: Masovian
- County: Płońsk
- Gmina: Baboszewo
- Elevation: 200 m (660 ft)

Jesionka [jɛˈɕɔnka] is a village in the administrative district of Gmina Baboszewo, within Płońsk County, Masovian Voivodeship, in east-central Poland.
