= Adriano Fiorentino =

Italian sculptor

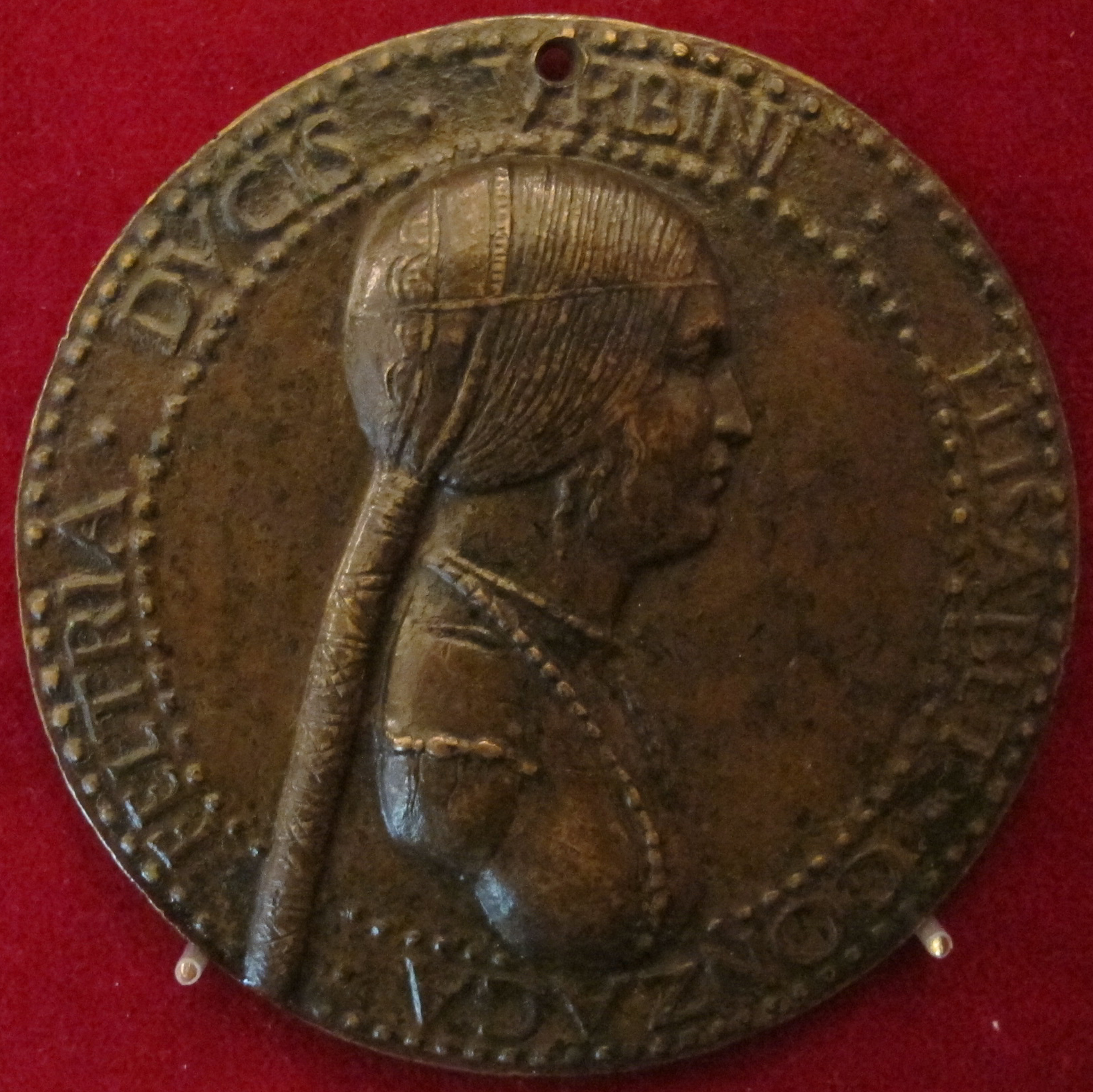
medal featuring the profile of Elisabetta Gonzaga, Duchess of Urbino by Adriano Fiorentino, 1495

Adriano Fiorentino (1440–1499), also known as Adriano di Giovanni De' Maestri, was an Italian medallist and sculptor.

Fiorentino was born in Florence. His first job may have been as a servant in the house of Lorenzo de' Medici. He later became a student of Bertoldo di Giovanni, and worked for a long time as a maker of cannons under the command of Virginio Orsini. In 1495 moved to Urbino, then later moved to Germany, but in 1499 he returned to his native city. Fiorentino died in 1499 in Florence.

== Bibliography ==
- Additional content translated from corresponding Italian Wikipedia article
