= Johannes Aesticampianus =

German theologian

Johannes Rhagius Aesticampianus
- Born: 1457; Sommerfeld, Lower Lusatia
- Died: 31 May 1520 (aged 62–63); Wittenberg
- Education: University of Kraków

Johannes Rhagius Aesticampianus (also Johannes Rak von Sommerfeld or Hans Rack) (1457 - 31 May 1520) was a German theologian and humanist.

== Life ==
Johannes Rak was born in 1457 in Sommerfeld (now Lubsko, Poland). His father, Matthias Rak, died young, and Johannes' grandfather Martin Rak, a mayor of Sommerfeld, saw to his education. Johannes matriculated at the University of Kraków on 19 May 1491, when he studied natural history and astronomy. In Kraków, he came under the influence of Conrad Celtes.

On Celtes' advice, Johannes undertook a study tour in 1499. He travelled to Vienna, Venice, Padua, Ferrara, Rome, and finally to Bologna, where he studied Greek. In Bologna he studied under Filippo Beroaldo and befriended Jakob Questenberg (1460–1527).

In 1506, he took a position at the newly founded University of Frankfurt as the Professor of Poetry and Rhetoric, alongside Gregor Schmerlin. He counted Ulrich von Hutten as one of his students; they had met in Frankfurt an der Oder, and Hutten followed him to Frankfurt.

He earned a doctorate in theology in Rome. In 1512 he lecture on Greek at Paris, and in 1513 he lectured at the University of Cologne. In 1514 he opened a Latin school in Cottbus and a year later in Saxon Freiburg, which was headed by Ulrich Rülein von Calw. Aesticampanius continued his university work and lectured on Pliny at the University of Wittenberg in the winter semester of 1517.

In winter 1519, Aesticampianus fell ill and afterwards suffered from shortness of breath. He died not long after on May 31 in Wittenberg, and was buried in the Stadtkirche Wittenberg.

== Works ==
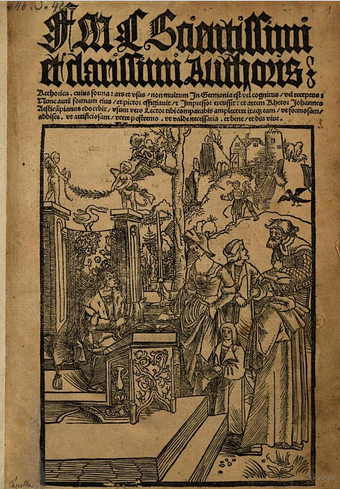

- Petri Heliae grammatica c. comment Joh. Sommerfelt Argent. 1499.
- Carmina Aesticampiani mit dem Versiculi Theodorici Gresmundi. Straßburg, 1502.
- Epigrammata Johannis Aesticampiani mit Carmen Huttens. Leipzig, 1507.
- Grammatica Martiani foelicis Capelle. Frankfurt an der Oder, 1507.
- Tabula Cebetis Philosophi Socratici, cum Jo. Aesticampiani Epistola, Impr. Frankfurt an der Oder, 1507.
- Septem divi Hieronymi epistolae… cum Johanni Aesticampiani carmine Leipzig 1508;
- C. Plinii Secundi Veronensis ad Titum Vespasianum in Libros naturalis historiae Epistola cum praefatione J. A. Rhetoris et poetae Laureati. Leipzig, 1508.
- Germania des Tacitus. Leipzig, 1509.
- Marciani Capellae Rhetorica, cum Jo. Rhagii verbosa praefatione. Leipzig, 1509.
- M. Tullii Ciceronis de Oratrore libri III. Etc. Praefatus est Jo. Rhagius Aesticampianus Theologus, ad Vitum Werlerum Sulzfeldensem, editorem. Leipzig, 1515.
- Modus epistolandi Magistri Johannis Aesticampiani. Wien, 1515.
- Aurelii Augustini libellus de Vita christiana. Leipzig, 1518.
- Augustini libellus de vita Christiana Leipzig, 1518.
- Carmen de Lusatia, quod Melanchthon Basileam, ut excuderetur, miserat, nescio quo fato periit, et nondum repertum est. n.p., n.d.
- Hymnus in laudem Barbarae. n.p., n.d.
- Commentarius in Grammaticam Marciani Capellae, et Donati figuras.
- Libanii graeci declamatoris disertismi, beati Johannis Chrysostomi praeceptoris, Epistolae, cum adjectis Johannis Summerfelt argumentis et emendatione et castigatione clarissimis.
