= Bożewo, Płońsk County =

Village in Gmina Baboszewo, Poland

Bożewo
- Village
- Location within Poland
- Coordinates: 52°41′18″N 20°9′44″E
- Country: Poland
- Voivodeship: Masovian
- County: Płońsk
- Gmina: Baboszewo

Bożewo [bɔˈʐɛvɔ] is a village in the administrative district of Gmina Baboszewo, within Płońsk County, Masovian Voivodeship, in east-central Poland.
