= Polissya (disambiguation) =

Polissya is the Ukrainian name of the historical region of Polesia .

Polissia or Polissya may also refer to:

- Polissya hotel in the abandoned city of Pripyat, Ukraine
- Polissia Nature Reserve, Ukraine
- Polissia Okruha, an administrative division of the Ukrainian State (1918)
- FC Polissya Zhytomyr, Ukrainian football club from Zhytomyr
- FC Polissya Zhytomyr (women), Ukrainian women's team of the Polissya football club from Zhytomyr
- FC Polissya Stavky, Ukrainian football club from Stavky
