= Jesuit College in Pułtusk =

- Kolegium jezuickie w Pułtusku
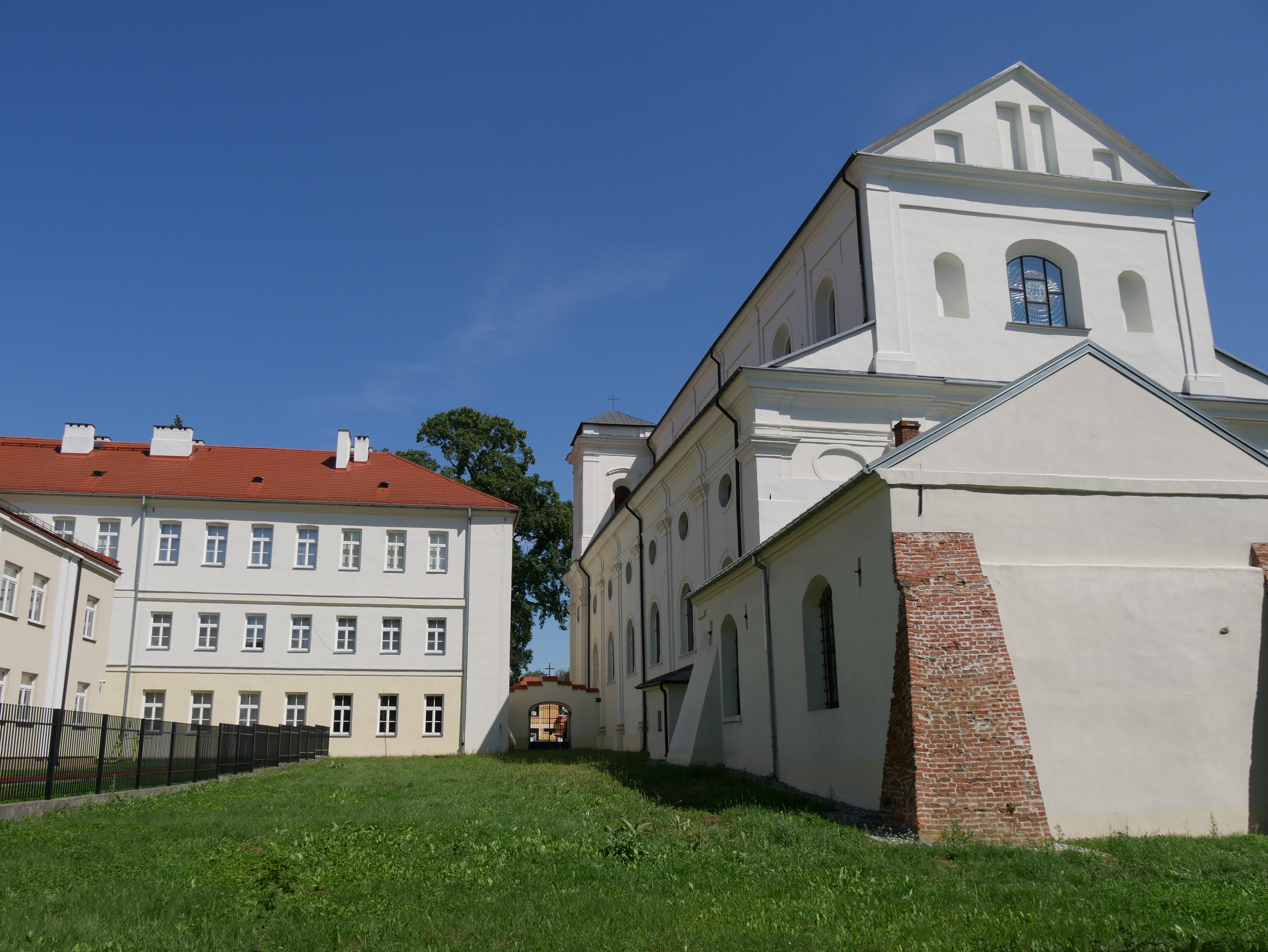
- The Church of Saints Peter and Paul around which the college buildings were centred
- Pułtusk; Kingdom of Poland, Polish–Lithuanian Commonwealth

Information
- Type: Jesuit college
- Religious affiliation: Society of Jesus
- Established: 1566
- Founder: Andrzej Noskowski
- Closed: 1773

The Jesuit College in Pułtusk was a Jesuit college in Pułtusk, operating from 1566 until the suppression of the Society of Jesus in 1773. It was one of the largest educational institutions in the Polish–Lithuanian Commonwealth and the Kingdom of Poland.

== History ==
The college was founded in 1566 by the Bishop of Płock, Andrzej Noskowski, who granted the Jesuits the masonry building erected in 1555 for the collegiate school attached to the Collegiate Basilica of the Annunciation of the Blessed Virgin Mary in Pułtusk. He endowed the institution with the estates of Boszewo, Przekory and Szelków, as well as tithes from the villages of Borek, Międzylesie, Cisówka and the city of Przasnysz. During the following decades the college's landed possessions increased substantially through donations.

The first Jesuits arrived in Pułtusk from the Jesuit College in Braniewo in 1566, and instruction began in July of that year with only the lowest grammar class. Classes in poetry and rhetoric were added in 1567 and 1568. The brick, two-storey college building was constructed between the town wall and the wooden school building. On the opposite side of the street stood a wooden boarding house (bursa), connected to the college complex by a bridge spanning the street. Soon afterwards, the Korzycki townhouse was also acquired for use by the school. The Jesuits likewise purchased a garden located beyond the canal on the so-called Abraham's Hill.

For many years, the school did not have its own church. Construction of the Church of the Holy Trinity, begun by Noskowski, was not completed until 1583, during the reign of Stephen Báthory and Anna Jagiellon. The church received a priceless relic from the queen, the head of Saint Ladislaus. The relic has not survived to the present day. The church was destroyed in the fire of 1646, a larger Church of Saints Peter and Paul was erected on a different site, with construction continuing intermittently until 1702.

In 1594 a diocesan seminary was established, and the curriculum was expanded to include Greek, philosophy, theology and mathematics. As a result, the institution developed beyond a secondary school and acquired some characteristics of a higher educational establishment. The college maintained a Jesuit theatre from the beginning of its existence, staging not only religious plays but also secular works, including classical dramas.

The school quickly became highly popular, with enrolment rising from 361 students in 1573 to 600 in 1592, 800 in 1610, and around 900 between 1696 and 1773. This made it the third largest school in the Kingdom of Poland by student population. It admitted boys from both the nobility and the burgher class.

The increase in enrolment necessitated the expansion of the college. Between 1571 and 1583 the original building was enlarged by the addition of three wings surrounding a central courtyard. The architect responsible for this reconstruction was Massimo Milanesi. In 1594 a separate building was erected for the higher-level classes. Additional reconstruction followed fires in 1613 and 1646, while extensive repairs were carried out between 1659 and 1677 after the devastation caused by the Swedish Deluge.

Following the suppression of the Jesuit order in 1773, the college was dissolved, and the school was taken over by the Commission of National Education. Most of its buildings were destroyed in a fire in 1798. During the first quarter of the nineteenth century the Benedictines, who had become the owners of the complex, constructed a new school building within the former Jesuit enclosure, which survives today.

Jesuit College in Pułtusk was one of the leading centres of the Counter-Reformation in Poland. Among its teachers were Jakub Wujek, translator of the Polish version of the Bible, Piotr Skarga, Andrzej Bobola, mathematician Oswald Krüger, and Wojciech Slaski. The school educated 26,635 students over the course of its 207-year history. Notable alumni included Andrew Báthory, nephew of King Stephen Báthory and later a cardinal, the poet Maciej Kazimierz Sarbiewski, the poet Stanisław Grochowski, Jerzy Ossoliński, and Jan Chrzciciel Albertrandi.

== Bibliography ==
- Lolo, Radosław (2012). "Działalność szkół jezuickich w Pułtusku od XVI do XVIII wieku. Powstanie kolegium jezuickiego w Pułtusku" [Activity of the Jesuit Schools in Pułtusk from the Sixteenth to the Eighteenth Century. The Establishment of the Jesuit College in Pułtusk]. Nasza Przeszłość (in Polish). 117: 315–336.
- Stabrowska, Danuta (2001). "Zaplecze gospodarcze (piwnice) przy kolegium jezuickim w Pułtusku" [The Economic Facilities (Cellars) of the Jesuit College in Pułtusk]. Rocznik Mazowiecki (in Polish). 13: 97–109.
- Stabrowska, Danuta (2007). "Lochy" [Vaults]. Pułtuskie osobliwości [Curiosities of Pułtusk] (in Polish). Warsaw: Muzeum Regionalne w Pułtusku. pp. 131–148.
