= Dalanówek railway station =

Railway station in Dalanówek, Poland

Dalanówek
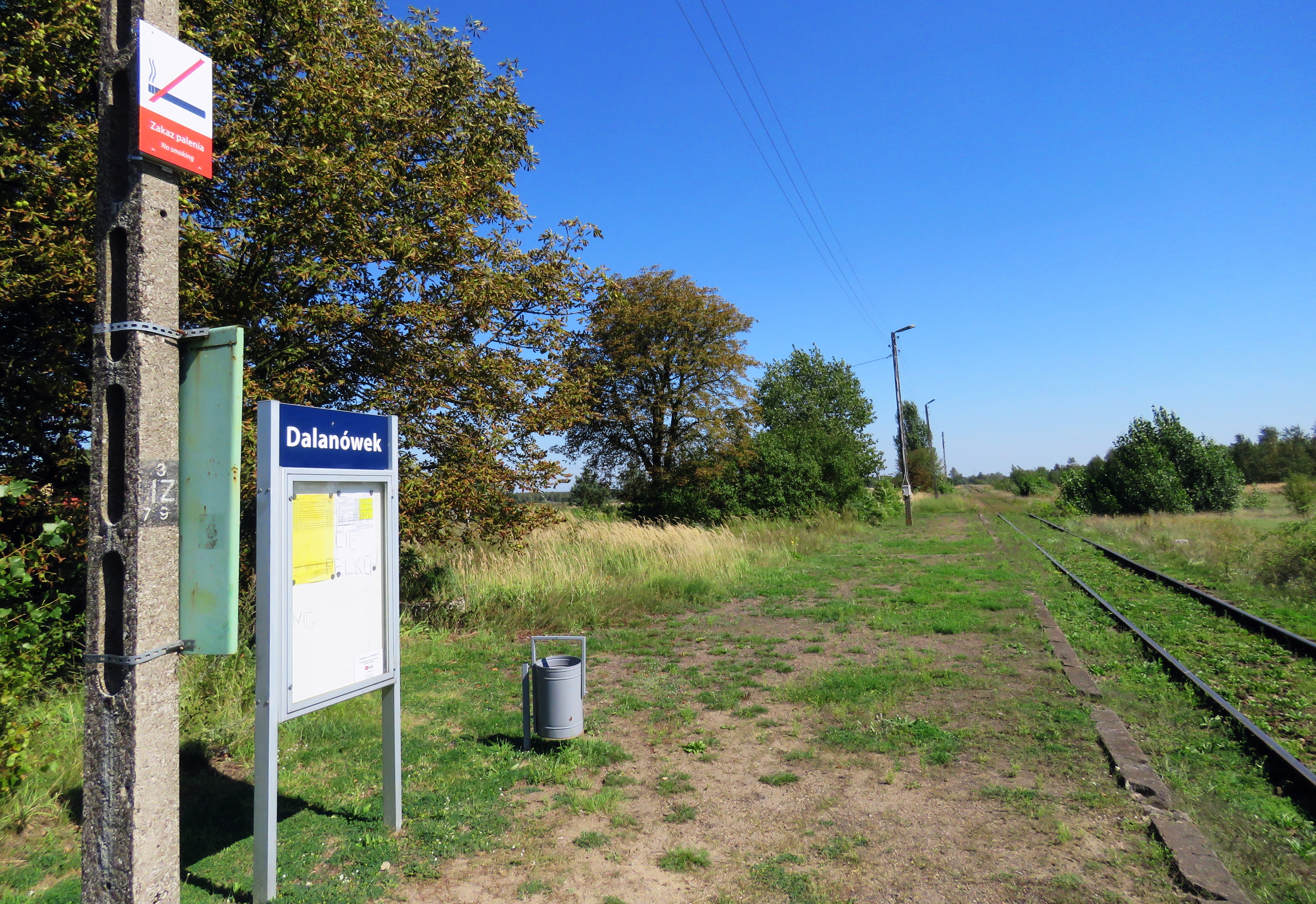

General information
- Location: Dalanówek, Płońsk, Płońsk, Masovian; Poland
- Coordinates: 52.6053°N 20.4475°E
- System: Rail Station
- Owner: Polskie Koleje Państwowe S.A.
- Operator: Masovian Railways
- Line: PKP Railway line 9 (Poland)

Services
Preceding station	Masovian Railways	Following station
Wkra towards Nasielsk	R91	Płońsk towards Sierpc
Wkra towards Warszawa Gdańska	RE91	Płońsk towards Sierpc
Location

Dalanówek railway station (Polish: Przystanek kolejowy Dalanówek) is a railway halt located in the village of Dalanówek in Płońsk County, Masovian Voivodeship, Poland. The station serves as a stop on Railway line 9, which connects Warsaw with northern Poland via Nasielsk, Ciechanów, and Działdowo.

== Location and infrastructure ==
The station is situated in the small village of Dalanówek, within the administrative boundaries of Płońsk County in the Masovian Voivodeship. It operates as a railway halt rather than a full station, providing basic passenger services for the local community and travelers along the Warsaw-northern Poland corridor.

The station infrastructure is managed by PKP Polskie Linie Kolejowe S.A., Poland's national railway infrastructure manager. The station is located on railway line 9, which forms part of Poland's national railway network connecting Warsaw with northern regions of the country.

== Services ==
Passenger services at Dalanówek are provided by Masovian Railways (Masovian Railways), the regional railway operator for the Masovian Voivodeship. The company operates as "Koleje Mazowieckie - KM" sp. z o.o., headquartered at ul. Lubelska 26, Warsaw.

=== Route connections ===
Dalanówek station provides connections along a regional railway corridor serving the Masovian region. The route connects smaller communities in the area with the Warsaw metropolitan area and provides access to Poland's broader railway network through connections at major stations.

Adjacent stations on the line include:

- Northbound: toward Nasielsk
- Southbound: toward Warszawa Gdańska
