= Kaczorowo railway station =

Railway station in Kaczorowy, Poland

Kaczorowo

General information
- Location: Kaczorowy, Raciąż, Płońsk, Masovian; Poland
- Coordinates: 52.7329234°N 20.1622383°E
- System: Rail Station
- Owner: Polskie Koleje Państwowe S.A.

Services
Preceding station	Masovian Railways	Following station
Baboszewo towards Nasielsk	R91	Raciąż towards Sierpc
Baboszewo towards Warszawa Gdańska	RE91	Raciąż towards Sierpc
Location

Kaczorowo railway station is a railway station in Kaczorowy, Płońsk, Masovian, Poland. It is served by Masovian Railways.
