= Wkra railway station =

Railway station in Poland

Wkra
- Station in August 2023

General information
- Location: Józefowo, Masovian Voivodeship; Poland
- Coordinates: 52.585007°N 20.5715915°E
- Owner: Polish State Railways

Services
| Preceding station | Masovian Railways | Following station |
|---|---|---|
| Cieksyn towards Nasielsk | R91 | Dalanówek towards Sierpc |
| Cieksyn towards Warszawa Gdańska | RE91 | Dalanówek towards Sierpc |
Location

Wrka railway station is a railway station in Józefowo, Płońsk, Masovian, Poland. It is served by Masovian Railways.
