= Koziebrody railway station =

Railway station in Koziebrody, Poland

Koziebrody
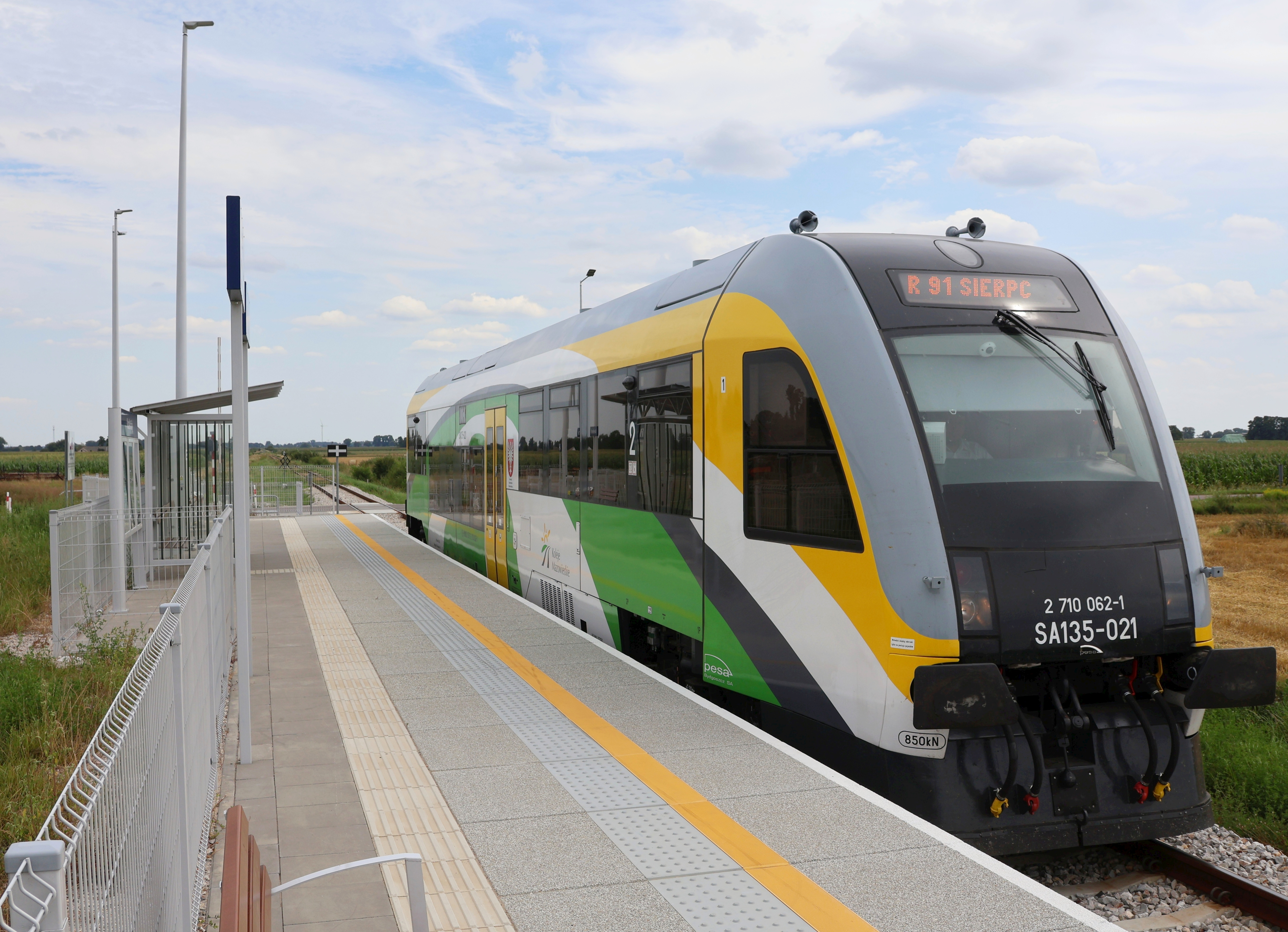
- Koziebrody railway station

General information
- Location: Koziebrody, Raciąż, Płońsk, Masovian; Poland
- Coordinates: 52.7984874°N 19.9955103°E
- System: Rail Station
- Owner: Polskie Koleje Państwowe S.A.

Services
| Preceding station | Masovian Railways | Following station |
|---|---|---|
| Raciąż towards Nasielsk | R91 | Zawidz Kościelny towards Sierpc |
| Raciąż towards Warszawa Gdańska | RE91 | Zawidz Kościelny towards Sierpc |
Location

Koziebrody railway station is a railway station in Koziebrody, Płońsk, Masovian, Poland. It is served by Masovian Railways.
