= Arcelin railway station =

Railway station in Arcelin, Poland

Arcelin

General information
- Location: Arcelin, Masovian Voivodeship; Poland
- Coordinates: 52.6597985°N 20.318477°E
- Owner: Polish State Railways

Services
Preceding station	Masovian Railways	Following station
Płońsk towards Nasielsk	R91	Baboszewo towards Sierpc
Płońsk towards Warszawa Gdańska	RE91	Baboszewo towards Sierpc
Location

Arcelin is a railway station in Arcelin, Płońsk County, Masovian Voivodeship, in central Poland. It is served by Masovian Railways.
