= Zawidz railway station =

Polish rail station

Zawidz
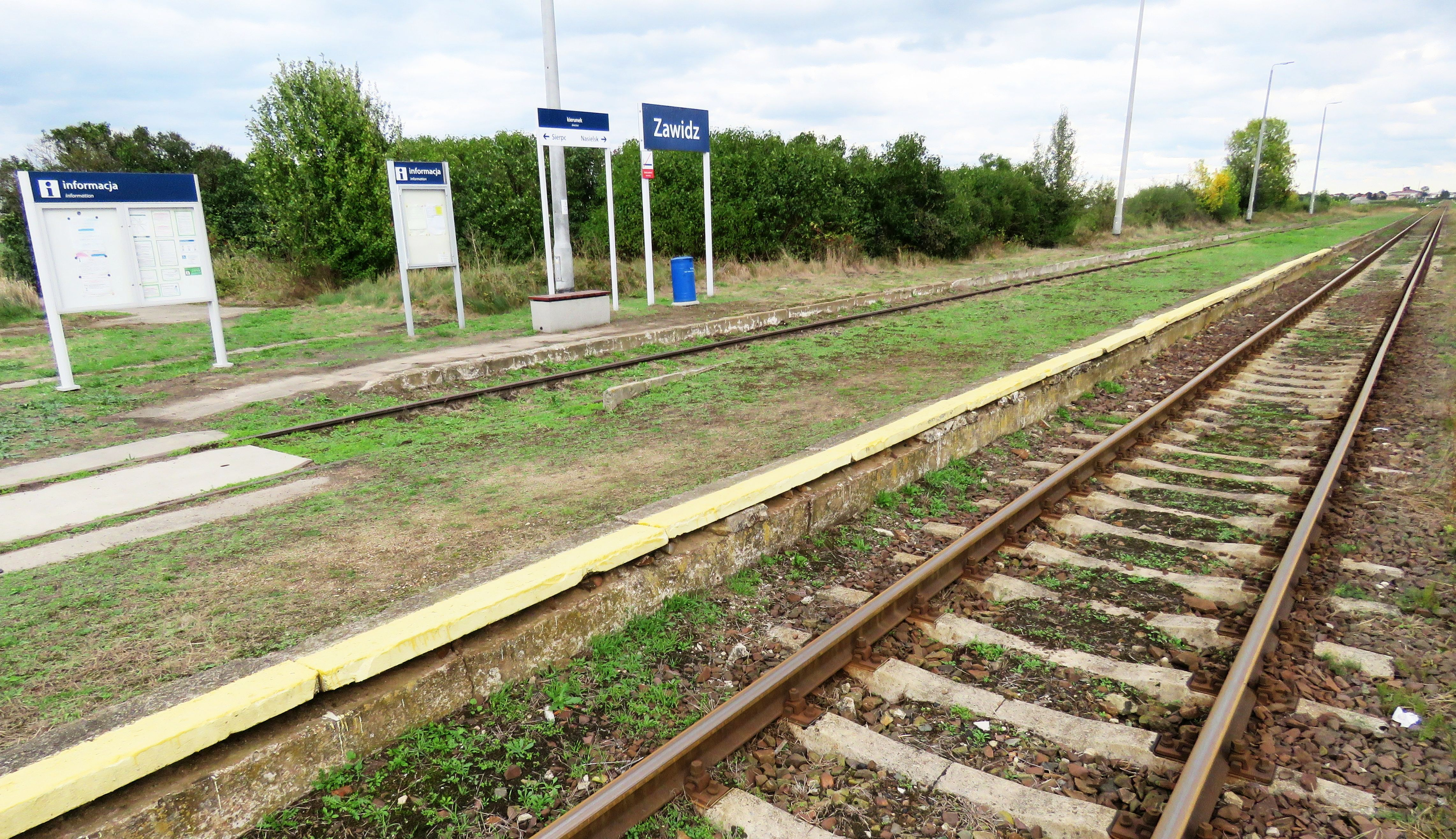
- Zawidz railway station

General information
- Location: Zawidz Kościelny, Zawidz, Sierpc, Masovian; Poland
- Coordinates: 52.8294333°N 19.844168°E
- System: Rail Station
- Owner: Polskie Koleje Państwowe S.A.

Services
Preceding station	Masovian Railways	Following station
Zawidz Kościelny towards Nasielsk	R91	Mieszaki towards Sierpc
Zawidz Kościelny towards Warszawa Gdańska	RE91	Mieszaki towards Sierpc
Location

Zawidz railway station is a railway station in Zawidz Kościelny, Sierpc, Masovian, Poland. It is served by Masovian Railways.
