= Cieksyn railway station =

Railway station in Masovian, Poland

Cieksyn
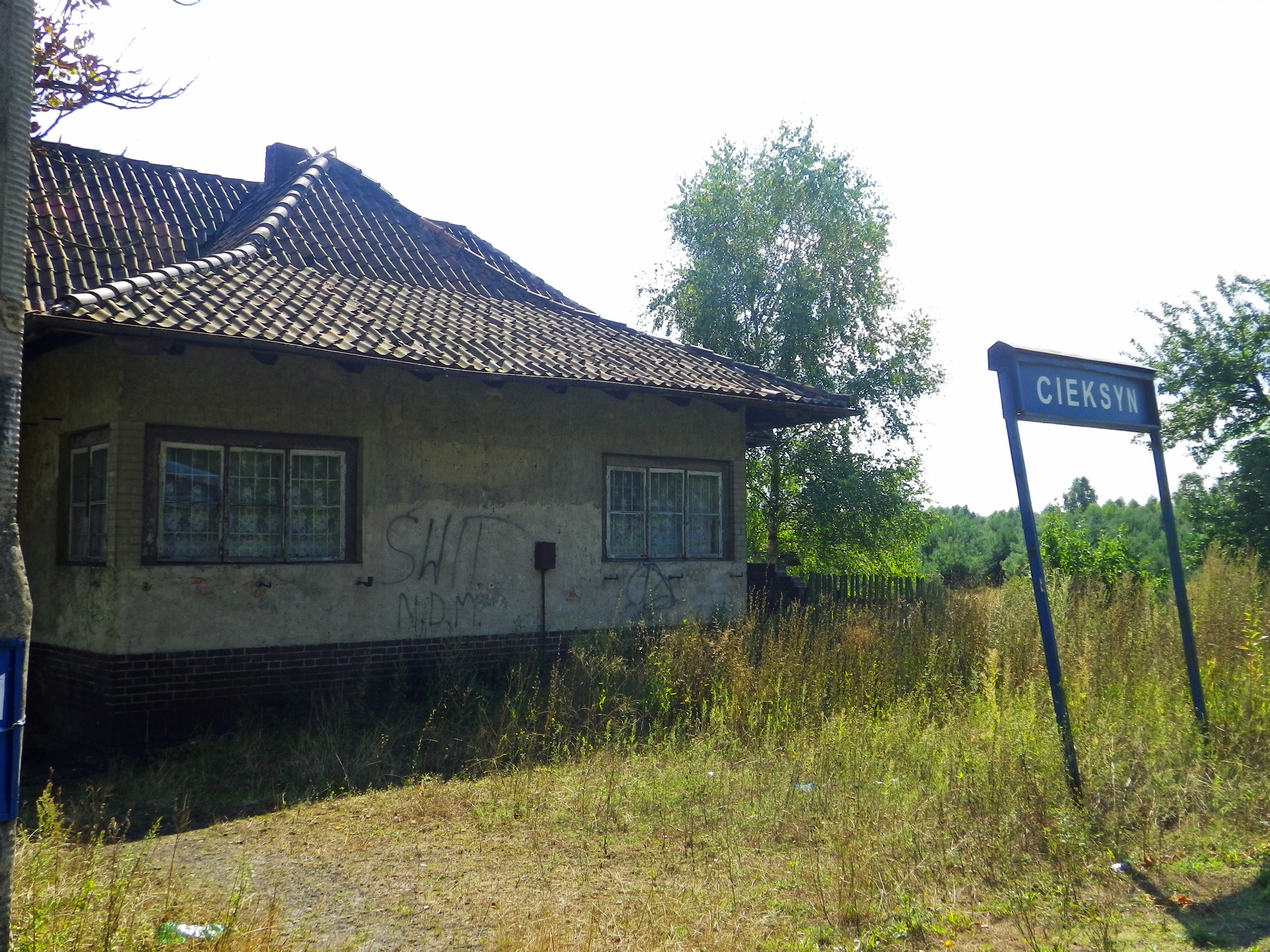

General information
- Location: Cieksyn, Nasielsk, Nowy Dwór, Masovian; Poland
- Coordinates: 52.5773217°N 20.6618939°E
- System: Rail Station
- Owner: Polskie Koleje Państwowe S.A.

Services
| Preceding station | Masovian Railways | Following station |
|---|---|---|
| Nasielsk Terminus | R91 | Wkra towards Sierpc |
| Nasielsk towards Warszawa Gdańska | RE91 | Wkra towards Sierpc |
Location

Cieksyn railway station is a railway station in Cieksyn, Nowy Dwór, Masovian, Poland. It is served by Masovian Railways.
