= Zawidz Kościelny railway station =

Railway station in Zawidz Kościelny, Poland

Zawidz Kościelny

General information
- Location: Zawidz Kościelny, Gmina Zawidz, Sierpc County, Masovian Voivodeship; Poland
- Coordinates: 52.8239522°N 19.8780295°E
- System: Rail Station
- Owner: Polskie Koleje Państwowe S.A.

Services
Preceding station	Masovian Railways	Following station
Koziebrody towards Nasielsk	R91	Zawidz towards Sierpc
Koziebrody towards Warszawa Gdańska	RE91	Zawidz towards Sierpc
Location

Zawidz Kościelny railway station is a railway station in Zawidz Kościelny, Sierpc County, Masovian Voivodeship, Poland. It is served by Masovian Railways.

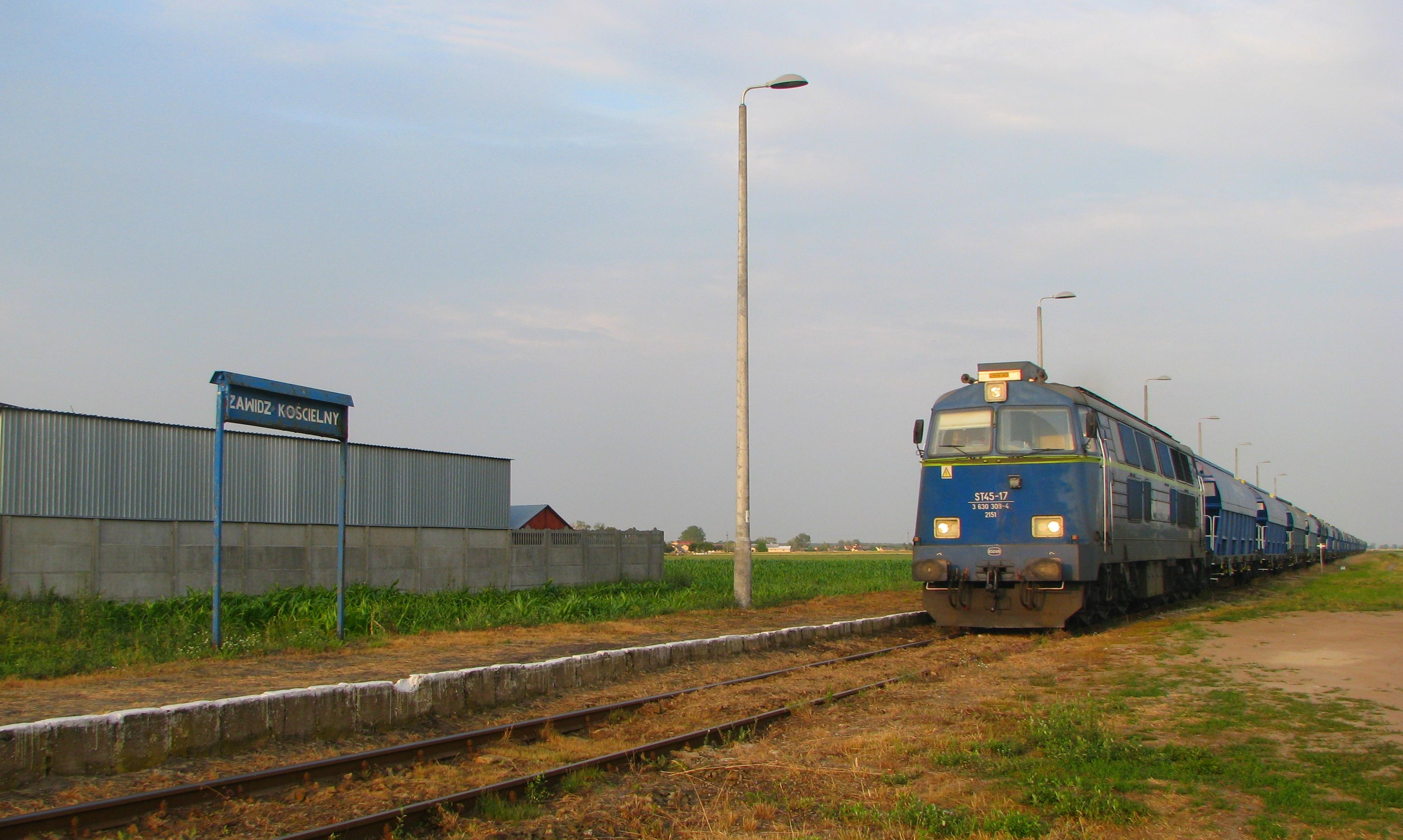
Zawidz Kościelny railway station
