= Baboszewo railway station =

Railway station in Baboszewo, Poland

Baboszewo

General information
- Location: Baboszewo, Masovian Voivodeship; Poland
- Coordinates: 52.6830575°N 20.2605466°E
- System: Rail Station
- Owner: Polish State Railways

Services
Preceding station	Masovian Railways	Following station
Arcelin towards Nasielsk	R91	Kaczorowo towards Sierpc
Arcelin towards Warszawa Gdańska	RE91	Kaczorowo towards Sierpc
Location
- Location within Poland Location within Europe

Baboszewo is a railway station in Baboszewo, Płońsk County, Masovian Voivodeship, in central Poland. It is served by Masovian Railways.
