= Płońsk railway station =

Railway station in Płońsk, Poland

Płońsk
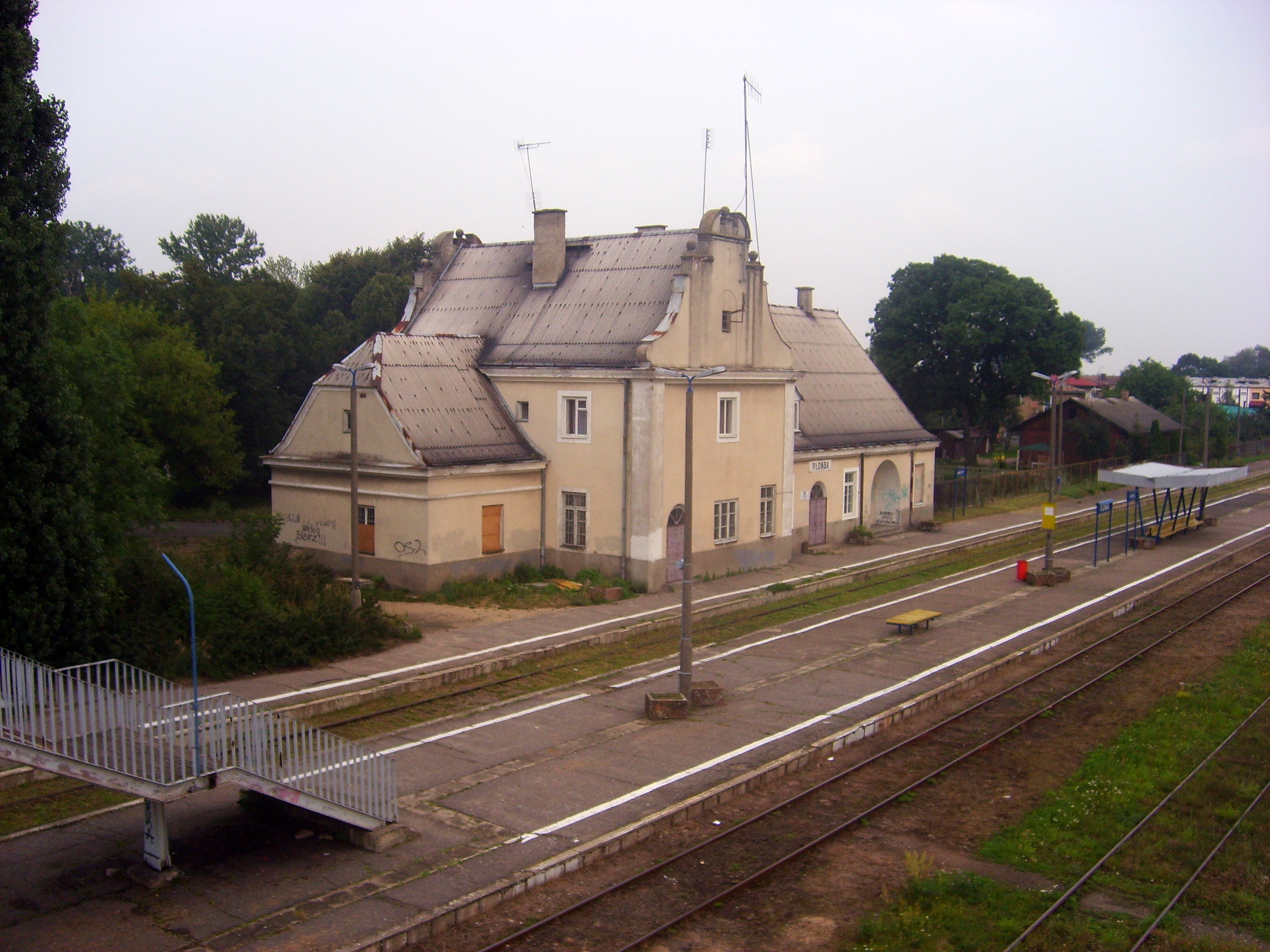

General information
- Location: Płońsk, Płońsk, Masovian; Poland
- Coordinates: 52.6160336°N 20.366991°E
- System: Rail Station
- Owner: Polskie Koleje Państwowe S.A.

Services
Preceding station	Masovian Railways	Following station
Dalanówek towards Nasielsk	R91	Arcelin towards Sierpc
Location

Płońsk railway station is a railway station in Płońsk, Płońsk, Masovian, Poland. It is served by Masovian Railways.
