= Mieszaki railway station =

Railway station in Mieszaki, Poland

Mieszaki
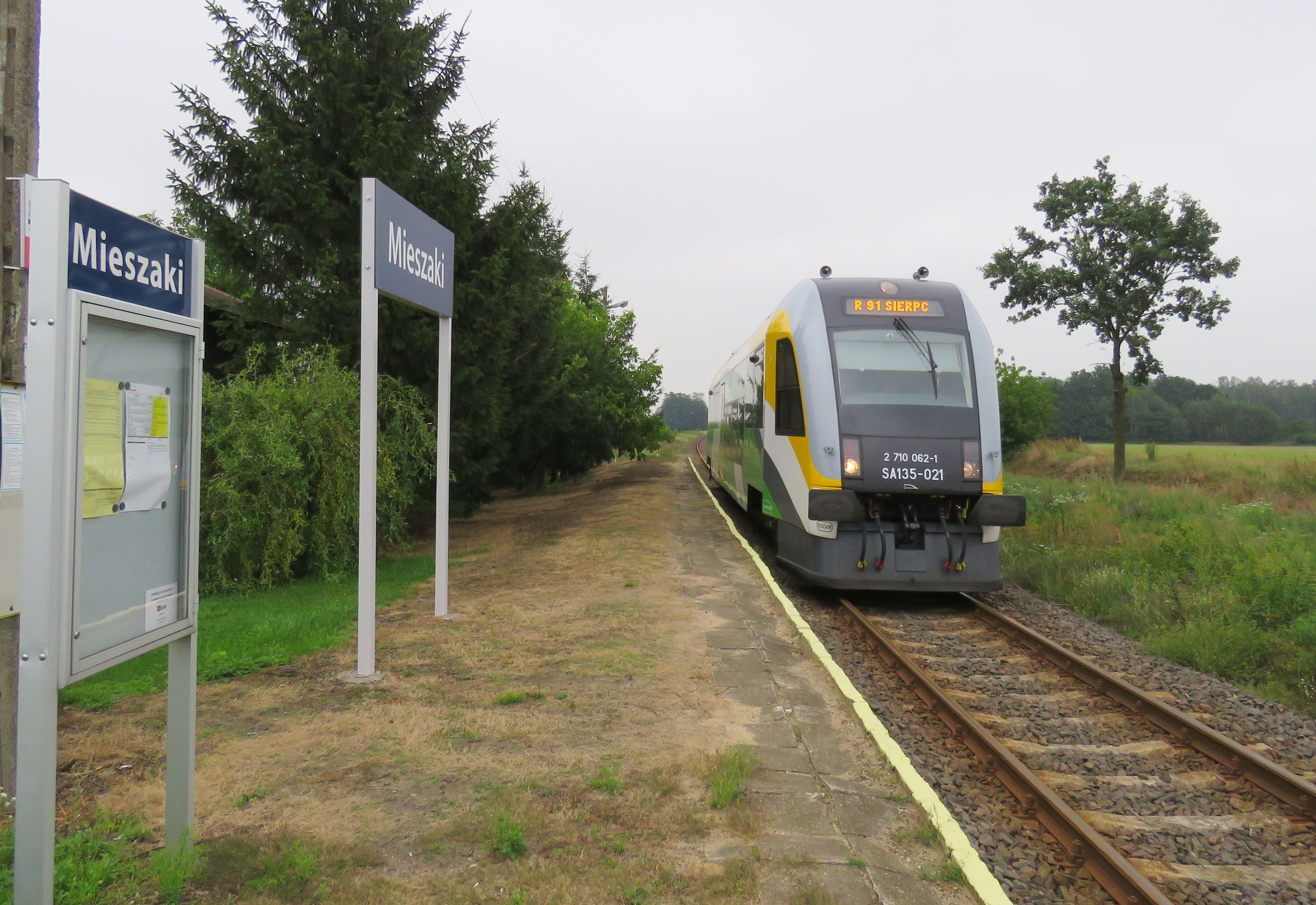

General information
- Location: Mieszaki, Sierpc, Sierpc, Masovian; Poland
- Coordinates: 52.8367349°N 19.7447877°E
- System: Rail Station
- Owner: Polskie Koleje Państwowe S.A.

Services
Preceding station	Masovian Railways	Following station
Zawidz towards Nasielsk	R91	Sierpc Terminus
Zawidz towards Warszawa Gdańska	RE91	Sierpc Terminus
Location

Mieszaki railway station is a railway station in Mieszaki, Sierpc, Masovian, Poland. It is served by Masovian Railways.
