= Raciąż railway station =

Railway station in Raciąż, Poland

Raciąż
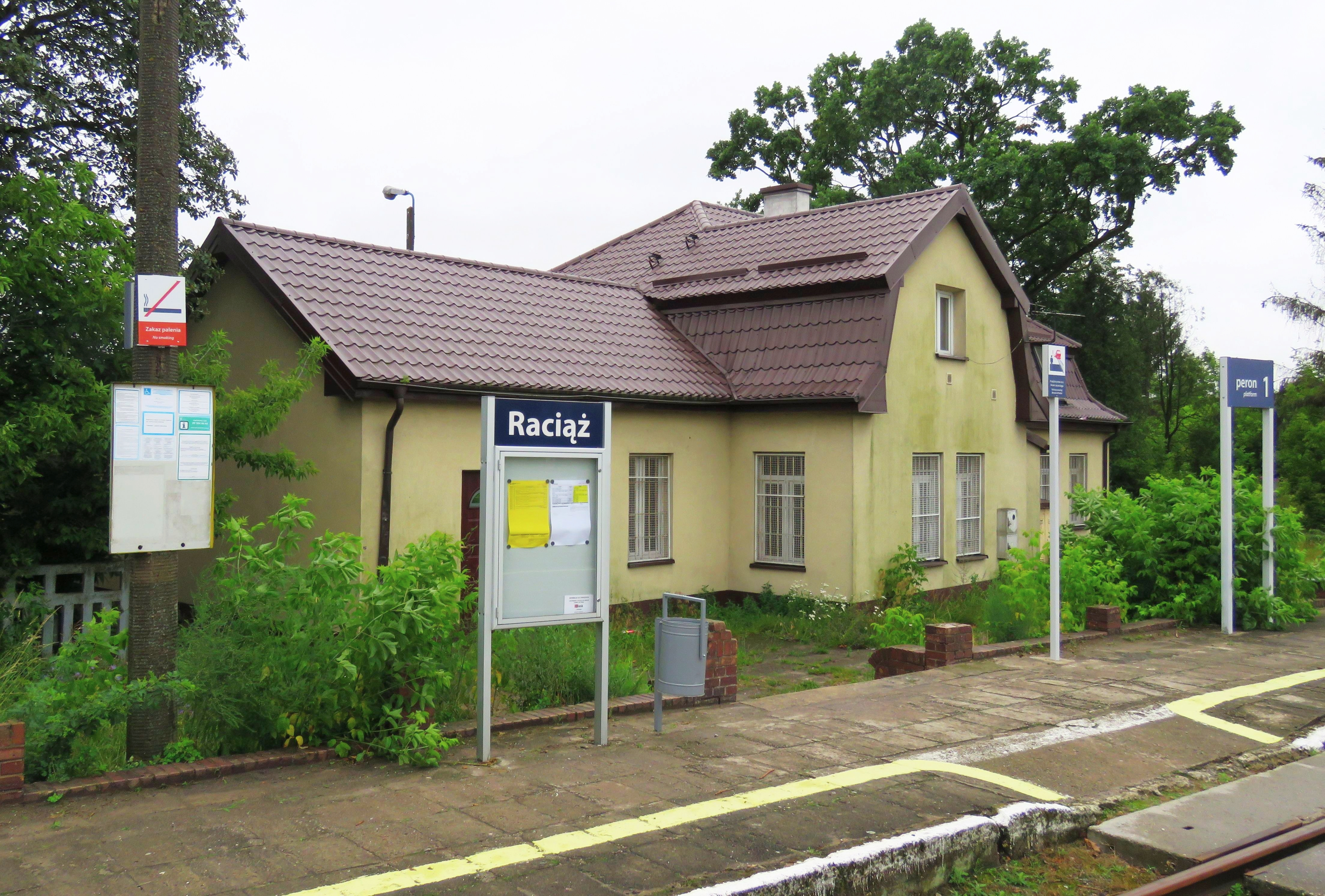

General information
- Location: Raciąż, Płońsk, Masovian; Poland
- Coordinates: 52.7788621°N 20.1048364°E
- System: Rail Station
- Owner: Polskie Koleje Państwowe S.A.

Services
Preceding station	Masovian Railways	Following station
Kaczorowo towards Nasielsk	R91	Koziebrody towards Sierpc
Kaczorowo towards Warszawa Gdańska	RE91	Koziebrody towards Sierpc
Location

Raciąż railway station is a railway station in Raciąż, Płońsk, Masovian, Poland. It is served by Masovian Railways.
