= Arcelin (disambiguation) =

Arcelin is a Polish village.

Arcelin may also refer to:

- Jean Arcelin (born 1962), Swiss teacher and painter
- Nicole Roy-Arcelin (born 1941), Canadian politician
- Paul Arcelin, Haitian activist
