= Halina Chmielewska =

Polish doctor (1899–1982)

- Born: 15 July 1899; Ćwiklin, Congress Poland
- Died: 14 February 1982 (aged 82); Warsaw, Polish People's Republic
- Resting place: Powązki Cemetery
- Education: University of Warsaw
- Occupation: Doctor
- Years active: 1924–1982
- Organization: Polish Red Cross
- Known for: Providing medical treatment during the Warsaw Uprising
- Honours: Cross of Valour; Warsaw Uprising Cross

Halina Chmielewska (15 July 1899 – 14 February 1982) was a Polish doctor known for her work during the Siege of Warsaw, the Warsaw Uprising, and in the Dulag 121 camp in Pruszków. Following the end of World War II, Chmielewska contributed to the establishment of health services in Szczecin as a representative of the Polish Red Cross, particularly for children.

== Early life and education ==
Chmielewska was born on 15 July 1899; while her birth certificate states she was born in "Cwiglin", it is understood that this was likely a misspelling of Ćwiklin, a village in rural Mazovia. Her parents were Ludwik Chmilewski and his wife Julia (née Gutkowska). Her father worked as an administrator for the Polish landed gentry. During World War I, the family were evacuated to Moscow. Following the October Revolution in 1917, Chmielewska returned to Poland, where she enrolled at the University of Warsaw, studying medicine between 1919 and 1924. She later underwent military training at the garrison hospital in Grudziądz.

After graduating in 1924, Chmielewska specialised in paediatrics under the supervision of Władysław Szenajch, a paediatrician and social activist who was the head of the Karol and Maria Hospital in Wola.

== Marriage and work in pre-war Poland ==
In 1927, Chmielewska married Stefan Chmielewski, who had studied philosophy and law. They had a daughter together, Maria Barbara, who was born on 20 June 1928. The family lived in an apartment at 42 ul. Długa in the Śródmieście district of Warsaw. Chmielewska worked for a health insurance fund, as well as a district paediatrician based in Warsaw's Old Town. She also underwent training in anti-gas and anti-aircraft defence for doctors at Ujazdów Hospital.

== World War II ==
=== Siege of Warsaw ===
Following the beginning of the invasion of Poland by Germany on 1 September 1939 and the subsequent siege of Warsaw, Chmielewska was appointed by Stefan Starzyński, the mayor of Warsaw and head of the Warsaw Defence Command, to serve as the sanitation chief for northern Warsaw. Working alongside Cyprian Odorkiewicz, she organised and supervised sanitation points in an area spanning from Jerusalem Avenue and the Vistula river to the neighbourhoods of Wawrzyszew and Powązki. Chmielewska delivered dressings and medicines, first by car and, later, by motorcycle.

Following the capitulation of Warsaw on 28 September, Chmielewska returned to the family home on ul. Długa, which had been partially destroyed during the invasion.

=== Occupation of Poland ===
Chmielewska continued to treat patients in the Old Town of Warsaw following the occupation of Poland and became a well-known figure in the local community. During this time, she joined the Polish resistance movement, including organising a supply of medication for prisoners being held in Pawiak, including her friend and colleague Anna Czuperska, who was held in Serbia Prison, Pawiak's women's wing.

=== Warsaw Uprising ===
Following the start of the Warsaw Uprising in August 1944, Chmielewska organised and ran first aid stations located on ul. Długa, including one at her home at number 42, as well as at the former Hotel Polski at number 29. At the Hotel Polski, she was supported in her work by medics from the Polish Scouting and Guiding Association, a medical student, and a nurse. Chmielewska was responsible for deciding who could be treated at the stations and who needed to be transferred to hospital, such as Dr. Broma Hospital at number 21 and the hospital within the Raczyński Palace at number 7. When shelling increased in the city, patients were transported through the basements of connected buildings on ul. Długa. Chmielewska and other medics were supported by Janusz Radziwiłł, a Polish noble, who officiated underground masses held by the Pallottines and ensured that the burial places of people killed during the uprising were marked to assist with future exhumation.

On 31 August 1944, units from the Home Army attempted to break through the German blockade around the Old Town in order to evacuate units from the Północ group into Śródmieście. The Polish attacks were not synchronised, ending in failure and heavy losses. On the evening of 1 September, Chmielewska was ordered to evacuate approximately 30 lightly injured soldiers through the sewers into Śródmieście by Karol Ziemski, the commander of the Old Town, contrary to orders made earlier in the day by Antoni Chruściel, the de facto commander of the Home Army. An attempt to transport the soldiers failed, and Chmielewska and the soldiers spent the night at 25 ul. Długa.

=== Dulag 121 camp in Pruszków ===
On 2 September, the Old Town was fully occupied by German soldiers. The group of soldiers were taken, alongside, Chmielewska, other resistance members and civilians, to Warszawa Zachodnia station, where they were deported to Dulag 121 camp in Pruszków, a transit camp. During the journey from Warsaw to Pruszków, Chmielewska observed resistance scout Marysia Draber, a nurse at the Hotel Polski, escape the train at an almost totally deserted train station in Ursus.

The day after arriving at the camp, Chmielewska began working at the outpatient clinic in block 1, alongside Felicja Hałacińska, a pulmonologist from Lviv, and a German doctor named Klenner. The three doctors issued many false medical certificates which allowed prisoners to be released from the camp, including Chmielewska's daughter, who was "diagnosed" by Hałacińska as having had end-stage tuberculosis.

Chmielewska went on to be transported to work in Ożarów, Sochaczew and Chodaków alongside the Congregation of the Sisters of the Immaculate Conception of the Blessed Virgin Mary. In November 1944 she moved to Kielce, before returning to Warsaw in February 1945. The war ended shortly afterwards.

== Post-war activities ==
Following the end of World War II Chmielewska, as a delegate of the Polish Red Cross, worked alongside members of the State Repatriation Office to negotiate a deal in Berlin to repatriate Poles back to central Poland through Szczecin. As the Polish Red Cross' representative in the city, Chmielewska arranged for Red Cross workers to receive accommodation in Szczecin on ul. Noakowskiego, as well as permission from Poland's temporary administration to establish a clinic and an office for the Polish Red Cross in the city centre. On 31 May 1947, Chmielewska was among the 43 founding members of the Szczecin Medical Society, which became a branch of the Polish Medical Association.

Chmielewska led the transfer of a former German military hospital on ul. Unii Lubelskiej, that was used by Soviet forces in the immediate aftermath of the war, to the Polish health service, which the hospital later being used by the Pomeranian Medical University after its founding in 1948. Chmielewska later described one of her proudest achievements as being the establishment of the Mother and Child Care Station on ul. Św. Wojciech.

After health services were established in Szczecin, Chmielewska primarily ran two paediatric outpatient clinics at sites at 63 al. Wojska Polskiego and 19 ul. Słowackiego, where she saw around 50 children a day on average. She also periodically supported nurseries and kindergartens with meeting children's health needs and was the head of a scarlet fever and diphtheria ward at an infectious diseases hospital. Due to increasing poor health, including osteoporosis, bronchial asthma and vision loss, Chmielewska left Szczecin. Prior to leaving the city, she contributed to the establishment of a children's ward in the city, including supplying a milk kitchen, adhering to the standards set by the National Institute of Public Health – National Institute of Hygiene, and creating paediatric clinic run by Artur Chwalibogwski.

After retiring, Chmielewska returned to Warsaw, where she lived with her daughter and granddaughter. She died on 14 February 1982, and was buried at the family plot in Powązki Cemetery.

== Recognition ==
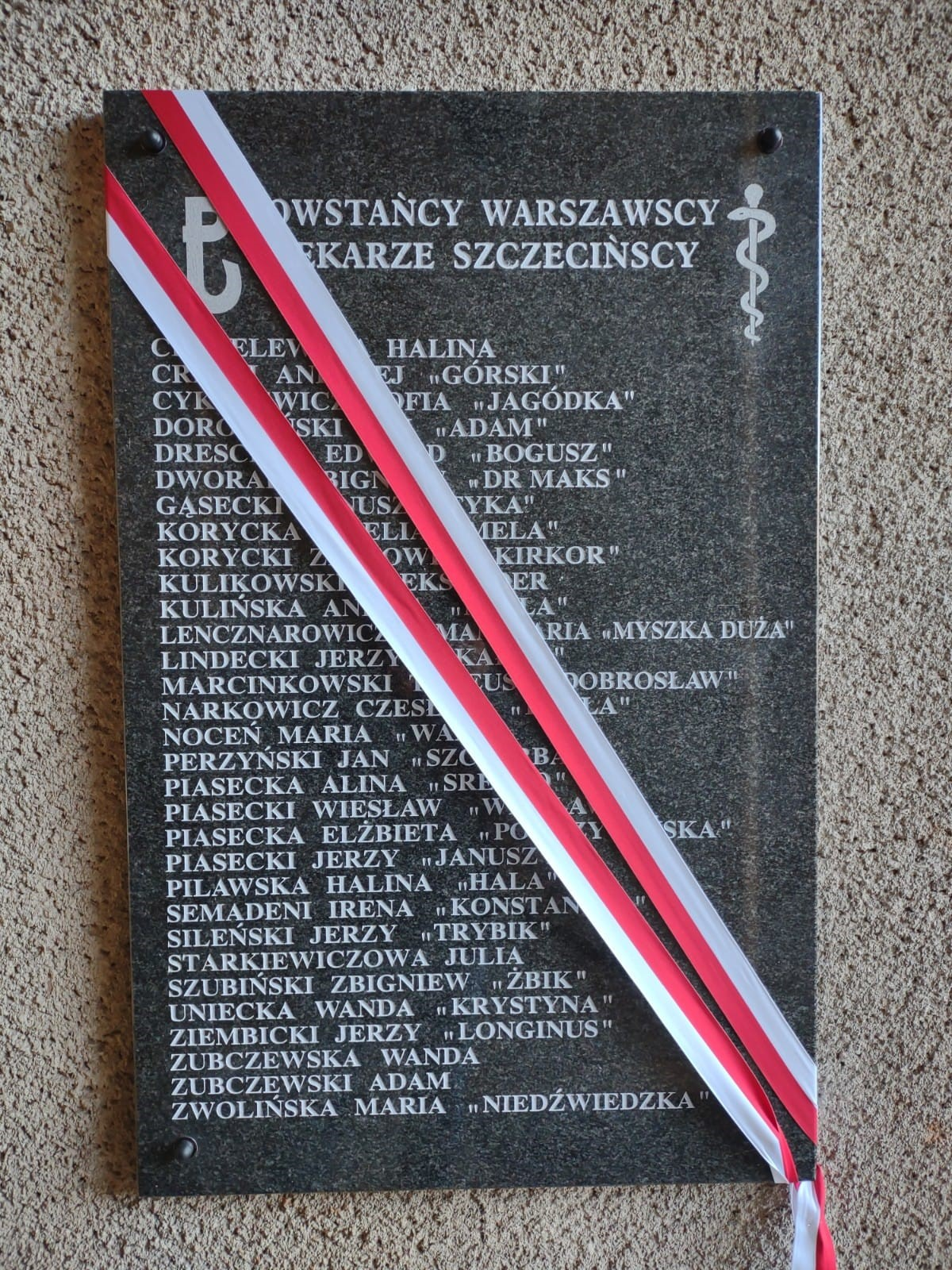
Plaque commemorating the 31 Szczecin doctors who participated in the Warsaw Uprising

Chmielewska was awarded the Cross of Valour for her role defending Warsaw during the uprising, and posthumously received the Warsaw Uprising Cross.

On 1 August 2011, to commemorate the 67th anniversary of the Warsaw Uprising, the Warsaw Museum of Independence held the exhibition "Kobiety w Powstaniu Warszawskim" (lit. 'Women of the Warsaw Uprising'), which honoured women insurgents, including Chmielewska among 27 women. Documents from her life displayed at the exhibition including her medical degree, a map of the battles that occurred on ul. Długa, and an ID card from her time working in Szczecin.

In December 2022, a commemorative plaque was placed outside the former headquarters of the District Medical Chamber at 11 ul. Curie Skłodowska, listing the 31 doctors who served as medical officers during the Warsaw Uprising who went on to work in Szczecin, including Chmielewska.
