= Stare Koziminy =

- Village
- Location within Poland
- Coordinates: 52°39′18″N 20°24′29″E
- Country: Poland
- Voivodeship: Masovian
- County: Płońsk
- Gmina: Płońsk

Stare Koziminy [ˈstarɛ kɔʑiˈminɨ] is a village in the administrative district of Gmina Płońsk, within Płońsk County, Masovian Voivodeship, in east-central Poland.
