= Strachowo =

- Village
- Location within Poland
- Coordinates: 52°37′29″N 20°26′26″E
- Country: Poland
- Voivodeship: Masovian
- County: Płońsk
- Gmina: Płońsk

Strachowo [straˈxɔvɔ] is a village in the administrative district of Gmina Płońsk, within Płońsk County, Masovian Voivodeship, in east-central Poland.
