= Ćwiklinek =

- Village
- Location within Poland
- Coordinates: 52°40′21″N 20°22′18″E
- Country: Poland
- Voivodeship: Masovian
- County: Płońsk
- Gmina: Płońsk

Ćwiklinek [t͡ɕfiˈklinɛk] is a village in the administrative district of Gmina Płońsk, within Płońsk County, Masovian Voivodeship, in east-central Poland.
