= Cieciórki =

- Village
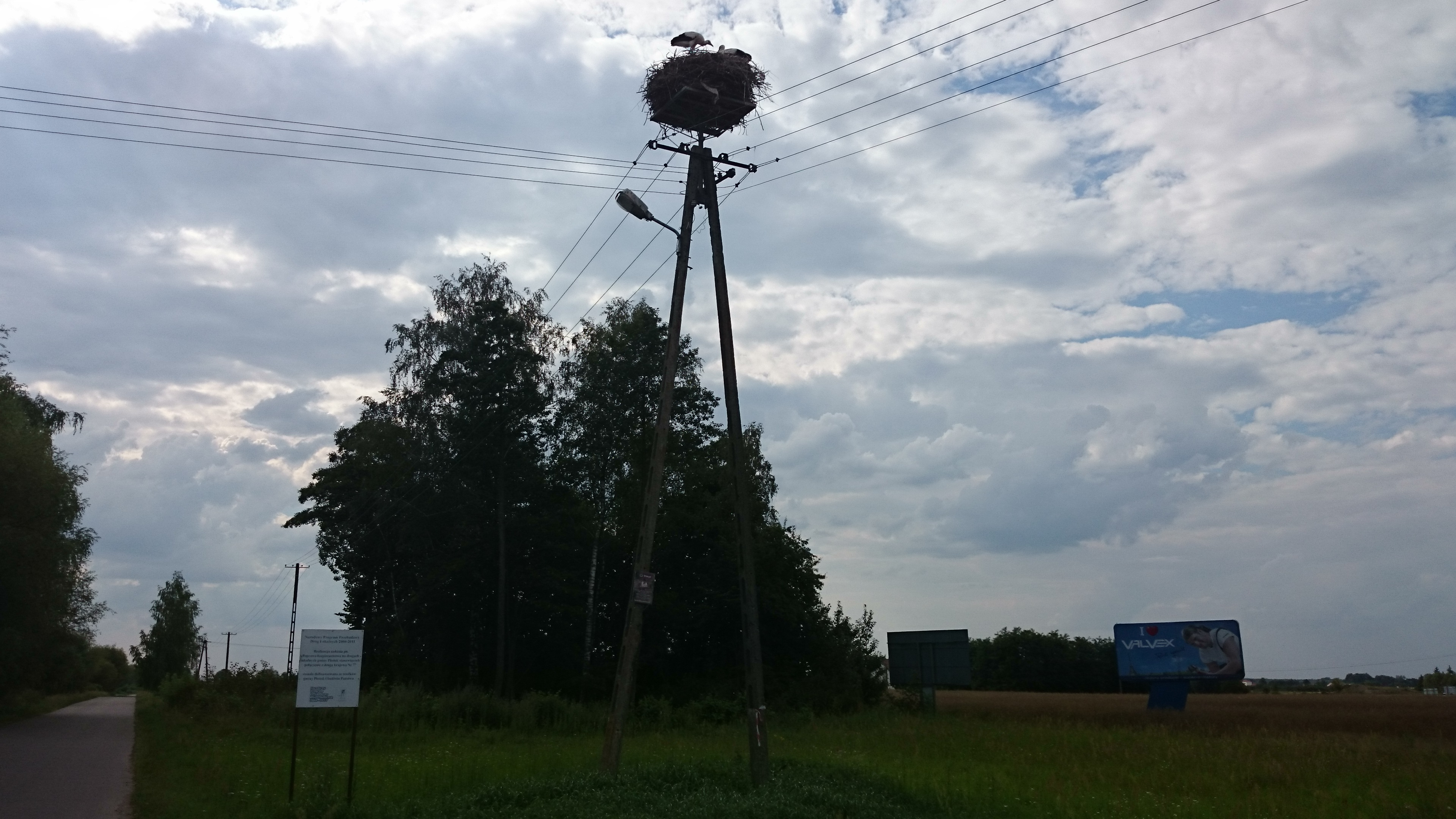
- Stork's Nest - national road No. 7 in the vicinity of the village of Cieciórki

- Location within Poland
- Coordinates: 52°39′27″N 20°22′57″E
- Country: Poland
- Voivodeship: Masovian
- County: Płońsk
- Gmina: Płońsk

Cieciórki (Polish pronunciation: [tɕɛˈtɕurkʲi]) is a village in the administrative district of Gmina Płońsk, within Płońsk County, Masovian Voivodeship, in east-central Poland.
