= Cholewy, Płońsk County =

Cholewy
- Village
- Location within Poland
- Coordinates: 52°35′N 20°19′E
- Country: Poland
- Voivodeship: Masovian
- County: Płońsk
- Gmina: Płońsk

Cholewy [xɔˈlɛvɨ] is a village in the administrative district of Gmina Płońsk, within Płońsk County, Masovian Voivodeship, in east-central Poland.
