= Kownaty, Płońsk County =

Kownaty
- Village
- Location within Poland
- Coordinates: 52°38′38″N 20°26′32″E
- Country: Poland
- Voivodeship: Masovian
- County: Płońsk
- Gmina: Płońsk
- Population: 100

Kownaty [kɔvˈnatɨ] is a village in the administrative district of Gmina Płońsk, within Płońsk County, Masovian Voivodeship, in east-central Poland.
