= Szpondowo =

- Village
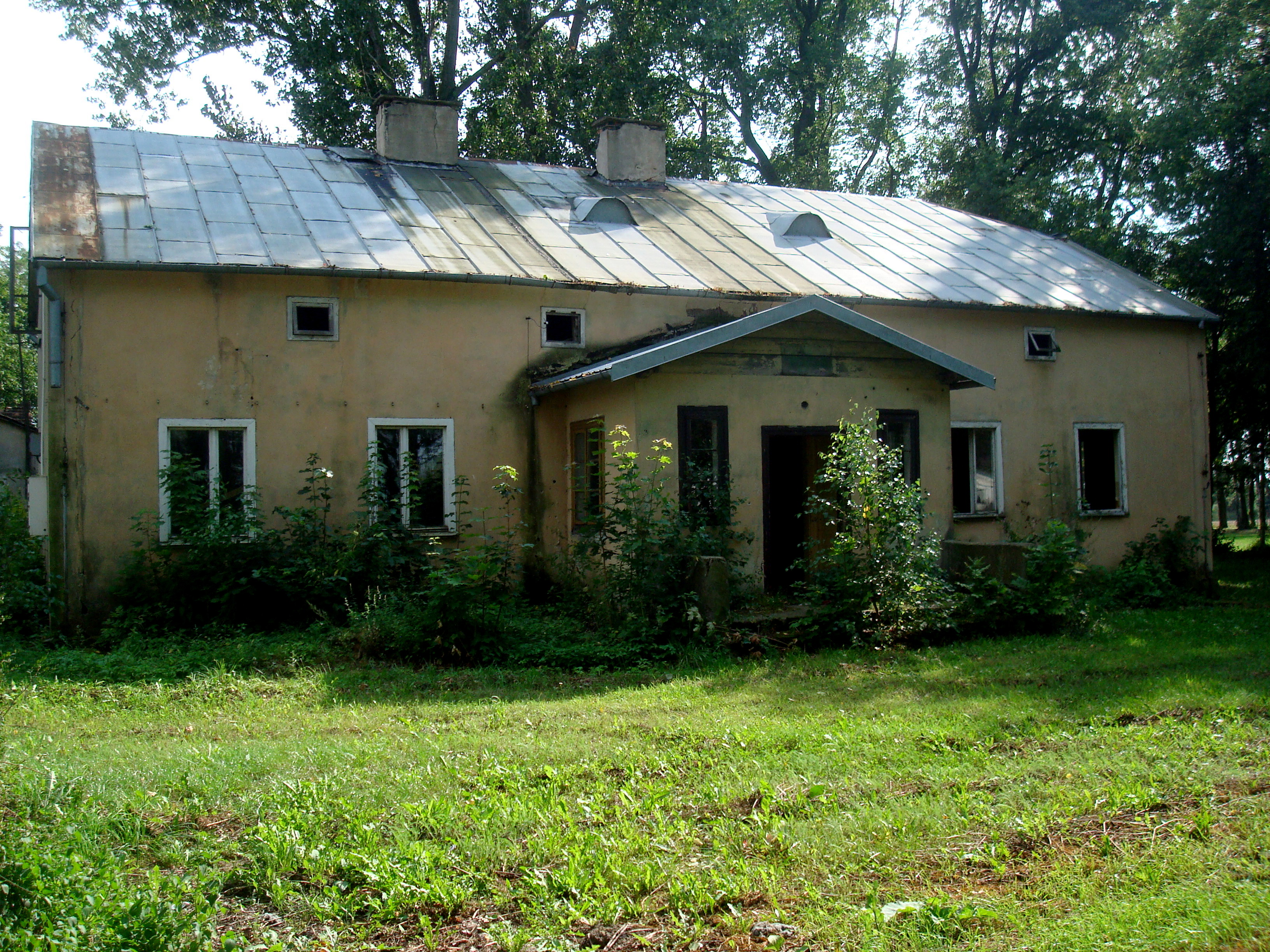

- Location within Poland
- Coordinates: 52°38′08″N 20°25′40″E
- Country: Poland
- Voivodeship: Masovian
- County: Płońsk
- Gmina: Płońsk

Szpondowo [ʂpɔnˈdɔvɔ] is a village in the administrative district of Gmina Płońsk, within Płońsk County, Masovian Voivodeship, in east-central Poland.
