= Raźniewo =

- Village
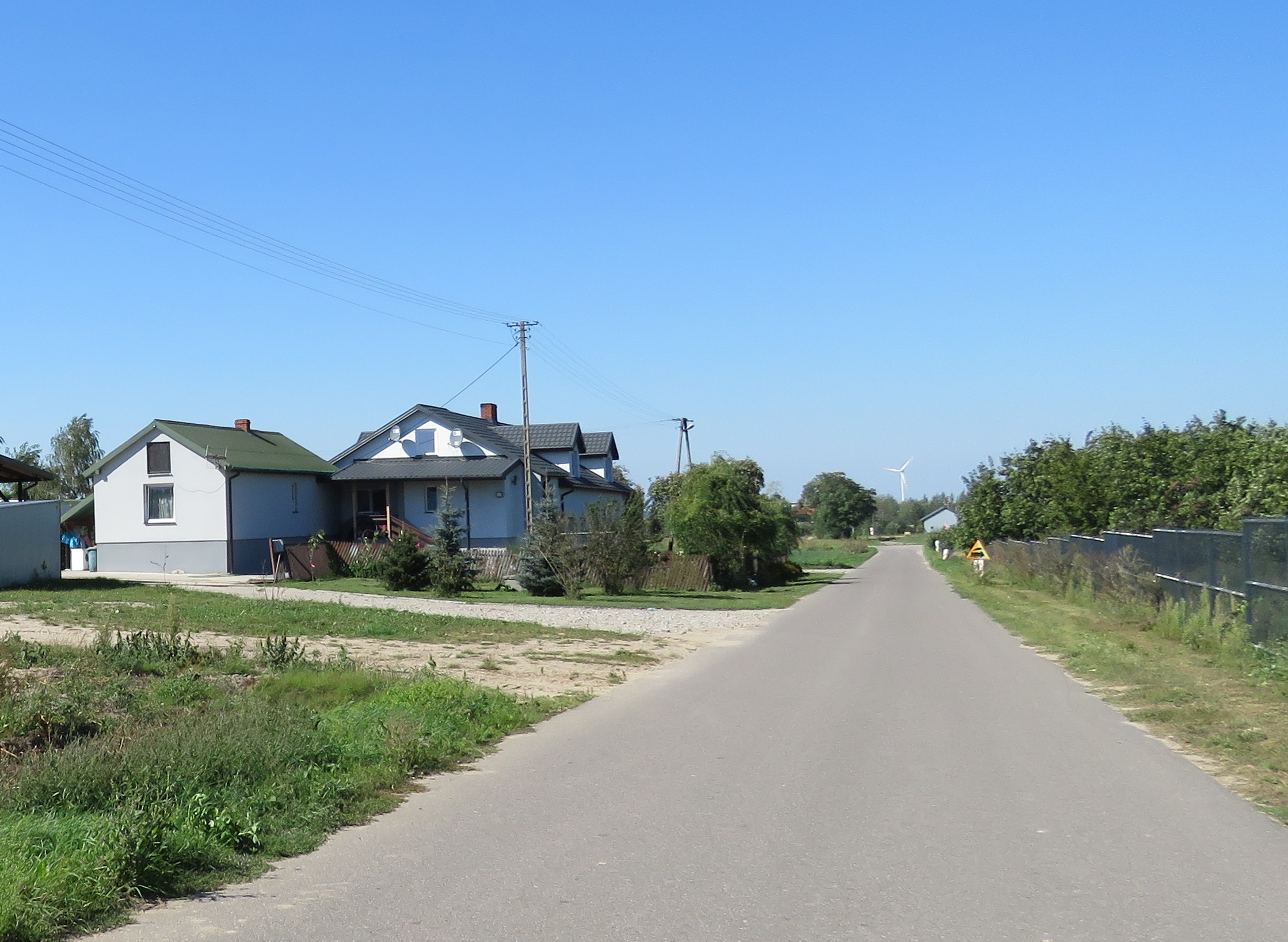
- Street of Raźniewo

- Location within Poland
- Coordinates: 52°36′11″N 20°25′10″E
- Country: Poland
- Voivodeship: Masovian
- County: Płońsk
- Gmina: Płońsk

Raźniewo [raʑˈɲɛvɔ] is a village in the administrative district of Gmina Płońsk, within Płońsk County, Masovian Voivodeship, in east-central Poland.
