= Dalanówek =

- Village
- Location within Poland
- Coordinates: 52°36′19″N 20°26′51″E
- Country: Poland
- Voivodeship: Masovian
- County: Płońsk
- Gmina: Płońsk

Dalanówek [dalaˈnuvɛk] is a village in the administrative district of Gmina Płońsk, within Płońsk County, Masovian Voivodeship, in east-central Poland.

== See also ==
- Dalanówek railway station
