= Siedlin =

- Village
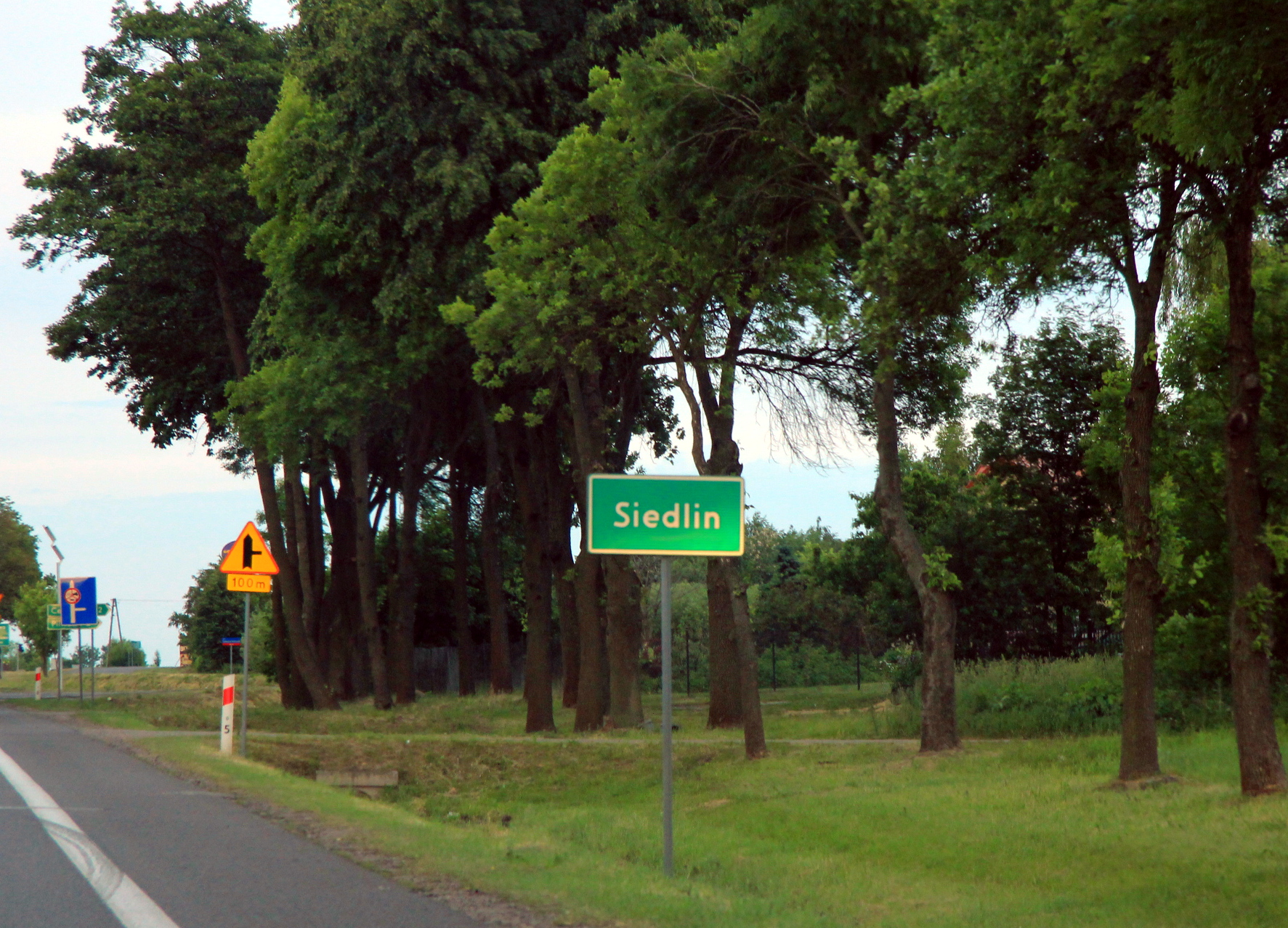

- Location within Poland
- Coordinates: 52°36′N 20°25′E
- Country: Poland
- Voivodeship: Masovian
- County: Płońsk
- Gmina: Płońsk

Siedlin [ˈɕɛdlin] is a village in the administrative district of Gmina Płońsk, within Płońsk County, Masovian Voivodeship, in east-central Poland.

== Transport ==
The S7 expressway bypasses Siedlin to the south. It is close to the junction of the S7 expressway / national roads 10 and 50. Exit 50 of the S7 expressway provides for quick access to Płońsk, Gdańsk (276km to the north-west) and Warsaw (66km to the south).

The nearest railway station is 3km away in the nearby town of Płońsk.
