= Lisewo, Masovian Voivodeship =

Lisewo
- Village
- Location within Poland
- Coordinates: 52°36′N 20°28′E
- Country: Poland
- Voivodeship: Masovian
- County: Płońsk
- Gmina: Płońsk
- Population: 240

Lisewo [liˈsɛvɔ] is a village in the administrative district of Gmina Płońsk, within Płońsk County, Masovian Voivodeship, in east-central Poland.
