= Pilitowo =

- Village
- Location within Poland
- Coordinates: 52°35′52″N 20°24′20″E
- Country: Poland
- Voivodeship: Masovian
- County: Płońsk
- Gmina: Płońsk

Pilitowo [piliˈtɔvɔ] is a village in the administrative district of Gmina Płońsk, within Płońsk County, Masovian Voivodeship, in east-central Poland.
