= Skarzyn, Masovian Voivodeship =

Skarzyn
- Village
- Location within Poland
- Coordinates: 52°35′58″N 20°20′12″E
- Country: Poland
- Voivodeship: Masovian
- County: Płońsk
- Gmina: Płońsk

Skarzyn [ˈskaʐɨn] is a village in the administrative district of Gmina Płońsk, within Płońsk County, Masovian Voivodeship, in east-central Poland. It was established by Jan of Skarżyno of the Bończa coat of arms. Around 1436, Jan was granted the land on a knightly right from Boleslaw IV, Prince of Mazovia.
