= Krępica, Masovian Voivodeship =

Krępica
- Village
- Location within Poland
- Coordinates: 52°35′31″N 20°30′23″E
- Country: Poland
- Voivodeship: Masovian
- County: Płońsk
- Gmina: Płońsk

Krępica [krɛmˈpit͡sa] is a village in the administrative district of Gmina Płońsk, within Płońsk County, Masovian Voivodeship, in east-central Poland.
