= Zawady, Płońsk County =

Zawady
- Village
- Location within Poland
- Coordinates: 52°35′54″N 20°21′45″E
- Country: Poland
- Voivodeship: Masovian
- County: Płońsk
- Gmina: Płońsk

Zawady [zaˈvadɨ] is a village in the administrative district of Gmina Płońsk, within Płońsk County, Masovian Voivodeship, in east-central Poland.
