= Szeromin =

- Village
- Location within Poland
- Coordinates: 52°38′53″N 20°19′58″E
- Country: Poland
- Voivodeship: Masovian
- County: Płońsk
- Gmina: Płońsk

Szeromin [ʂɛˈrɔmin] is a village in the administrative district of Gmina Płońsk, within Płońsk County, Masovian Voivodeship, in east-central Poland.
