= Jeżewo, Płońsk County =

Jeżewo
- Village
- Location within Poland
- Coordinates: 52°35′N 20°22′E
- Country: Poland
- Voivodeship: Masovian
- County: Płońsk
- Gmina: Płońsk

Jeżewo [jɛˈʐɛvɔ] is a village in the administrative district of Gmina Płońsk, within Płońsk County, Masovian Voivodeship, in east-central Poland.
