= Kluczewo, Masovian Voivodeship =

Kluczewo
- Village
- Location within Poland
- Coordinates: 52°37′51″N 20°17′53″E
- Country: Poland
- Voivodeship: Masovian
- County: Płońsk
- Gmina: Płońsk

Kluczewo [kluˈt͡ʂɛvɔ] is a village in the administrative district of Gmina Płońsk, within Płońsk County, Masovian Voivodeship, in east-central Poland.
