= Bogusławice, Płońsk County =

Bogusławice
- Village
- Location within Poland
- Coordinates: 52°34′21″N 20°23′1″E
- Country: Poland
- Voivodeship: Masovian
- County: Płońsk
- Gmina: Płońsk

Bogusławice [bɔɡuswaˈvit͡sɛ] is a village in the administrative district of Gmina Płońsk, within Płońsk County, Masovian Voivodeship, in east-central Poland.
