= Nowe Koziminy =

- Village
- Location within Poland
- Coordinates: 52°38′54″N 20°24′17″E
- Country: Poland
- Voivodeship: Masovian
- County: Płońsk
- Gmina: Płońsk
- Population: 90

Nowe Koziminy [ˈnɔvɛ kɔʑiˈminɨ] is a village in the administrative district of Gmina Płońsk, within Płońsk County, Masovian Voivodeship, in east-central Poland.
