= Słoszewo-Kolonia =

- Village
- Location within Poland
- Coordinates: 52°40′2″N 20°23′16″E
- Country: Poland
- Voivodeship: Masovian
- County: Płońsk
- Gmina: Płońsk
- Population: 90

Słoszewo-Kolonia [swɔˈʂɛvɔ kɔˈlɔɲa] is a village in the administrative district of Gmina Płońsk, within Płońsk County, Masovian Voivodeship, in Poland, it lies approximately 4 km (2 mi) north of Płońsk and 65 km (40 mi) northwest of Warsaw.
