= Gmina Płońsk =

Gmina Płońsk Płońsk Commune
- Gmina
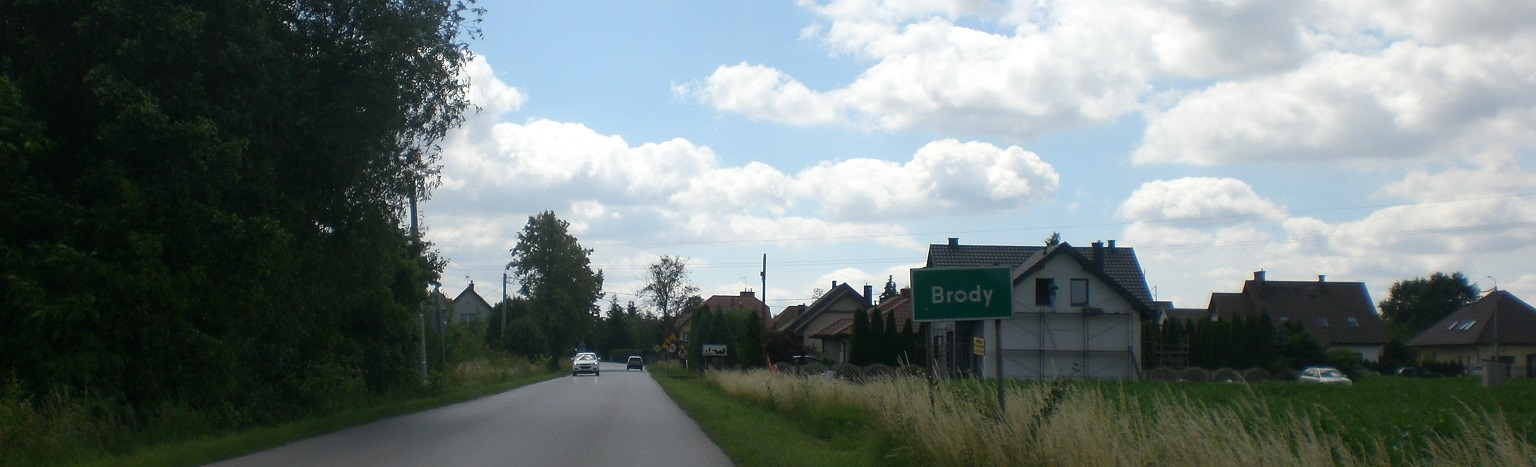

- Coat of arms
- Interactive map of Gmina Płońsk
- Coordinates (Płońsk): 52°38′N 20°23′E
- Country: Poland
- Voivodeship: Masovian
- County: Płońsk
- Seat: Płońsk

Area
  - Total: 127.3 km^{2} (49.2 sq mi)

Population (2013)
  - Total: 7,669
  - Density: 60.24/km^{2} (156.0/sq mi)
- Website: gminaplonsk.eu

Gmina Płońsk is a rural gmina (administrative district) in Płońsk County, Masovian Voivodeship, in east-central Poland. Its seat is the town of Płońsk, although the town is not part of the territory of the gmina.

The gmina covers an area of 127.3 square kilometres (49.2 sq mi), and as of 2006 its total population is 7,135 (7,669 in 2013).

== Villages ==
Gmina Płońsk contains the villages and settlements of:

- Arcelin
- Bogusławice
- Bońki
- Brody
- Cempkowo
- Cholewy
- Cieciórki
- Ćwiklin
- Ćwiklinek
- Dalanówko
- Ilinko
- Ilino
- Jeżewo
- Kluczewo
- Kownaty
- Koziminy-Stachowo
- Krępica
- Lisewo
- Michalinek
- Michowo
- Młyńsk
- Nowe Koziminy
- Pilitowo
- Poczernin
- Pruszyn
- Raźniewo
- Siedlin
- Skarzyn
- Skrzynki
- Słoszewo
- Słoszewo-Kolonia
- Stare Koziminy
- Strachówko
- Strachowo
- Strubiny
- Szeromin
- Szerominek
- Szpondowo
- Szymaki
- Woźniki
- Wroninko
- Zawady

== Neighbouring gminas ==
Gmina Płońsk is bordered by the town of Płońsk and by the gminas of Baboszewo, Dzierzążnia, Joniec, Naruszewo, Sochocin and Załuski.
