= Koziminy-Stachowo =

- Village
- Location within Poland
- Coordinates: 52°39′24″N 20°25′38″E
- Country: Poland
- Voivodeship: Masovian
- County: Płońsk
- Gmina: Płońsk
- Population: 110

Koziminy-Stachowo [kɔʑiˈminɨ staˈxɔvɔ] is a village in the administrative district of Gmina Płońsk, within Płońsk County, Masovian Voivodeship, in east-central Poland.
