= Woźniki, Płońsk County =

Woźniki
- Village
- Location within Poland
- Coordinates: 52°34′33″N 20°24′41″E
- Country: Poland
- Voivodeship: Masovian
- County: Płońsk
- Gmina: Płońsk

Woźniki [vɔʑˈniki] is a village in the administrative district of Gmina Płońsk, within Płońsk County, Masovian Voivodeship, in east-central Poland.
