= Polish Red Cross =

National Red Cross society in Poland

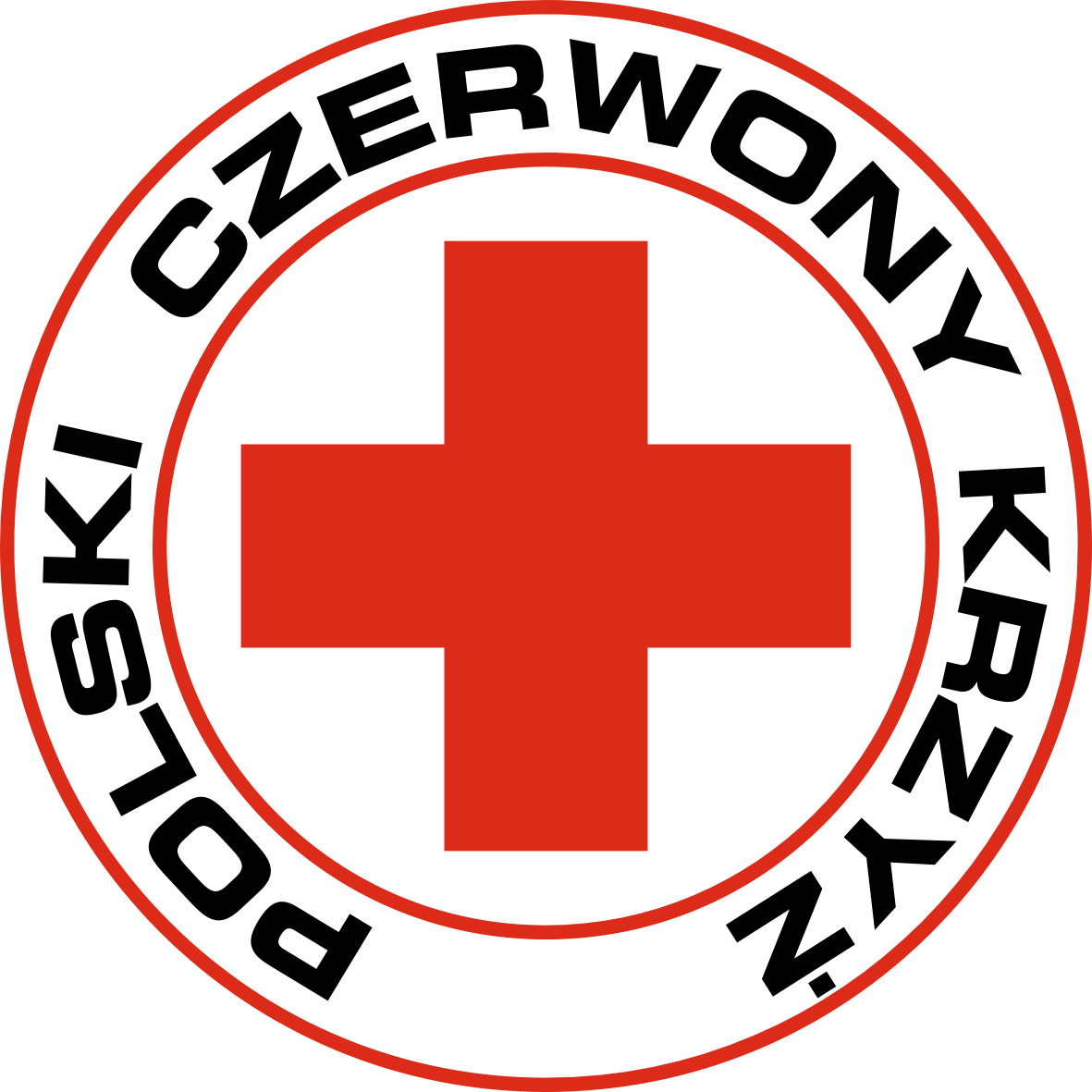
- Founded: 18 January 1919
- Type: Non-governmental organization
- Purpose: Humanitarian
- Location: Poland
- Region served: Worldwide
- Method: Aid
- Members: 600,000
- President: Stanisław Kracik
- Website: pck.pl

Polish Red Cross (Polish: Polski Czerwony Krzyż, abbr. PCK) is the Polish member of the International Red Cross and Red Crescent Movement. Its 19th-century roots may be found in the Russian and Austrian Partitions of the Polish–Lithuanian Commonwealth. On regaining its independence in 1918 Poland's charitable institutions were able to reconvene and establish the Red Cross on its territory under the presidency of Paweł Sapieha, formerly President of the Red Cross in Galicia. The new society was recognized by the International Red Cross on 24 July 1919. During the Polish People's Republic (1947–1989) the Polish Red Cross lost its autonomy and all its assets to the state. Across its hundred year history it continues its humanitarian work at home and abroad. Its focus is on education, exhumations and missing persons. It continues to carry aid to refugees.

== History ==
On 18 January 1919 the Polish Samaritan Society organized a meeting of all Polish charities that followed the Red Cross principles. With the support of Helena Paderewska, then head of what was called the Polish White Cross society, the participants formed the Polish Red Cross Society. A temporary committee of 30 was elected to develop draft statutes and to proceed with preparations of the new PCK.

== Polish Soviet War ==
In 1922 after the Polish–Soviet War the Polish Red Cross participated in an exchange of Polish and Russian prisoners. Ekaterina Peshkova the chairwoman of organisation, Assistance to Political Prisoners (Pompolit, Помощь политическим заключенным, Помполит), was given an award by the Polish Red Cross for her participation in the exchange of POWs. Before World War II the PCK operated ambulances on behalf of the Polish Army in order to aid the Army's budget.

== WWII ==
In 1942, the eminent Polish cryptologists Marian Rejewski and Henryk Zygalski escaped from occupied France to Spain. Upon arrival they were imprisoned by the Spanish. The Polish Red Cross made arrangements for food parcels to be delivered to the prisoners. Red Cross personnel sent a list in Polish of "Polish Prisoners" who were to receive food parcels. The Red Cross was later able to secure their release. During the Italian campaign in 1944, the director for the Red Cross in Anders' Army was Count Stefan Tyszkiewicz.

== Post-war ==
Following the end of World War II, the Polish Red Cross helped Polish authorities establish medical services in areas it had gained after the collapse of the German regime. Halina Chmielewska, for example, was the Polish Red Cross representative in Szczecin, where she oversaw the creation of hospitals and clinics across the city.
