= Pruszyn, Płońsk County =

Pruszyn
- Village
- Location within Poland
- Coordinates: 52°33′47″N 20°25′50″E
- Country: Poland
- Voivodeship: Masovian
- County: Siedlce
- Gmina: Siedlce

Pruszyn [ˈpruʂɨn] is a village in the administrative district of Gmina Siedlce, within Siedlce County, Masovian Voivodeship, in east-central Poland.
