= Cieksyn =

- Village
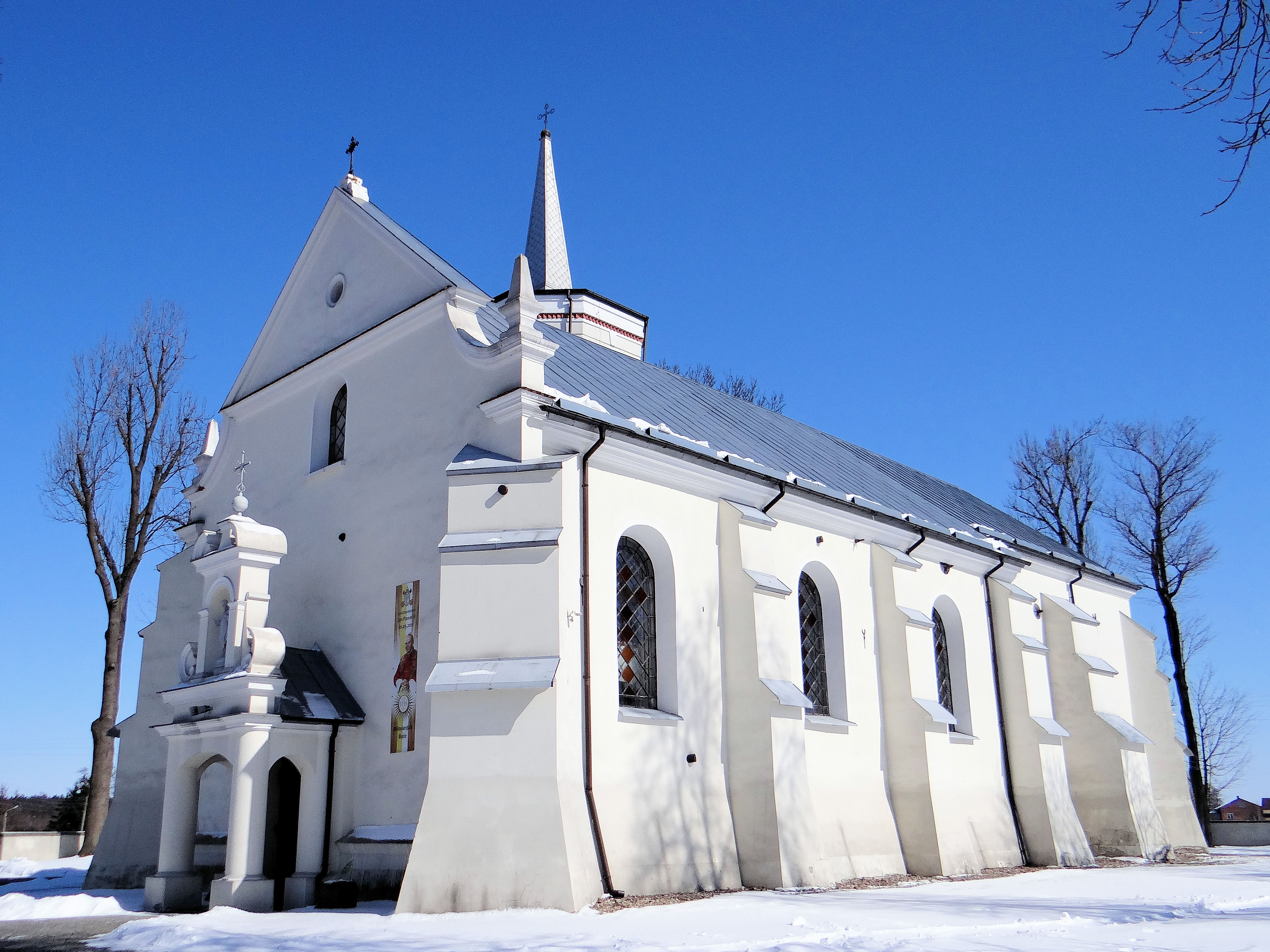
- Church of Saint Dorothy in Cieksyn

- Location within Poland
- Coordinates: 52°34′N 20°41′E
- Country: Poland
- Voivodeship: Masovian
- County: Nowy Dwór
- Gmina: Nasielsk
- Population (approx.): 2,000

Cieksyn [ˈt͡ɕɛksɨn] is a village in the administrative district of Gmina Nasielsk, within Nowy Dwór County, Masovian Voivodeship, in east-central Poland.
