= Józefowo, Płońsk County =

Józefowo
- Village
- Location within Poland
- Coordinates: 52°34′40″N 20°34′54″E
- Country: Poland
- Voivodeship: Masovian
- County: Płońsk
- Gmina: Joniec

Józefowo (Polish pronunciation: [juzɛˈfɔvɔ]) is a village in the administrative district of Gmina Joniec, within Płońsk County, Masovian Voivodeship, in east-central Poland.
