= Koziebrody =

- Village
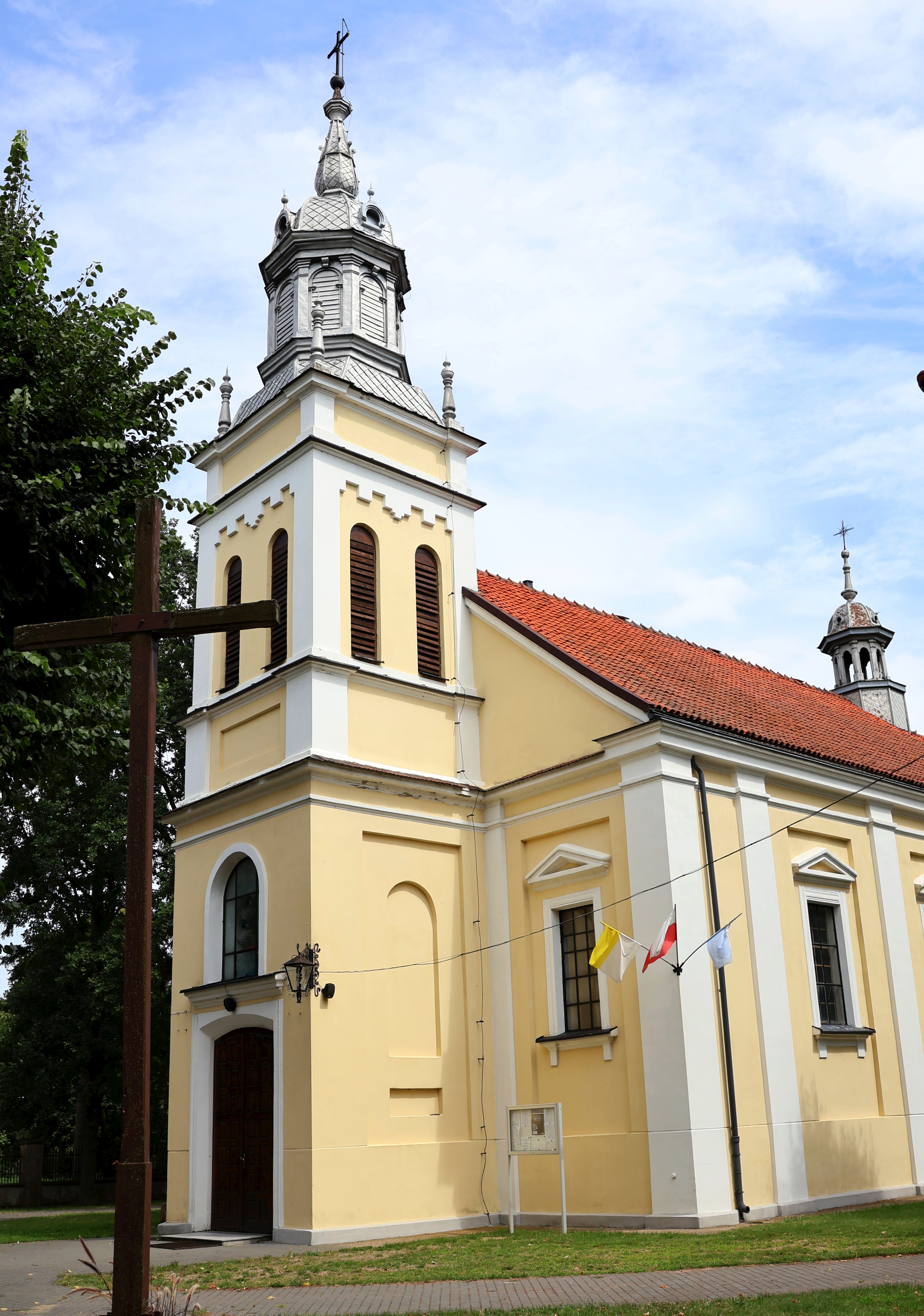
- Saint James the Greater church in Koziebrody

- Location within Poland
- Coordinates: 52°48′10″N 19°59′36″E
- Country: Poland
- Voivodeship: Masovian
- County: Płońsk
- Gmina: Raciąż

Koziebrody [kɔʑɛˈbrɔdɨ] is a village in the administrative district of Gmina Raciąż, within Płońsk County, Masovian Voivodeship, in east-central Poland.

The History of Koziebrody, Poland: 1373-1973, by Prof. John Kneski
