= Arcelin =

- Village
- Location within Poland
- Coordinates: 52°39′N 20°19′E
- Country: Poland
- Voivodeship: Masovian
- County: Płońsk
- Gmina: Płońsk

Arcelin [arˈt͡sɛlin] is a village in the administrative district of Gmina Płońsk, within Płońsk County, Masovian Voivodeship, in east-central Poland.
