= Nasielsk railway station =

Railway station in Mogowo, Poland

Nasielsk
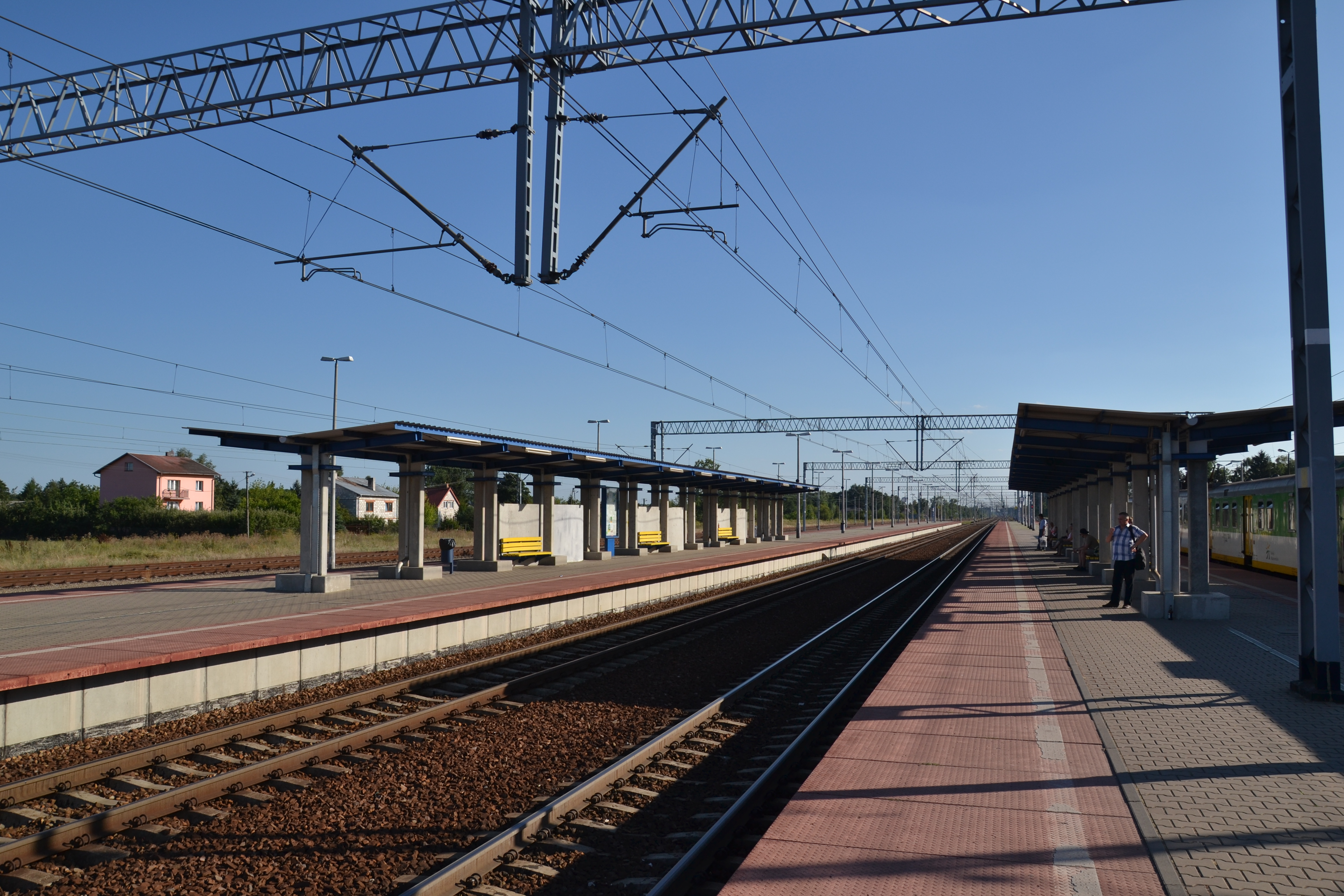

General information
- Location: Nowe Pieścirogi, Nasielsk, Nowy Dwór, Masovian; Poland
- Coordinates: 52°34′24″N 20°46′08″E
- System: Rail Station
- Owner: PKP Polskie Linie Kolejowe

Services
Preceding station	Masovian Railways	Following station
Studzianki Nowe towards Warszawa Zachodnia	R9	Kątne towards Działdowo
Studzianki Nowe towards Warszawa Zachodnia	R90	Kątne towards Działdowo
Pomiechówek towards Warszawa Zachodnia	RE9	Świercze towards Działdowo
Pomiechówek towards Warszawa Zachodnia	RE90	Świercze towards Działdowo
Terminus	R91	Cieksyn towards Sierpc
Modlin towards Warszawa Gdańska	RE91	Cieksyn towards Sierpc
Location

Nasielsk railway station is a railway station in Nowe Pieścirogi, Nowy Dwór, Masovian, Poland. It is served by Masovian Railways.

It has eight main tracks, plus a pair of side tracks and a ramp on its southern part.

There used to be a locomotive house in its northern part, but it was dismantled and access to it is no longer available.
