= Sierpc railway station =

Railway station in Sierpc, Poland

Sierpc
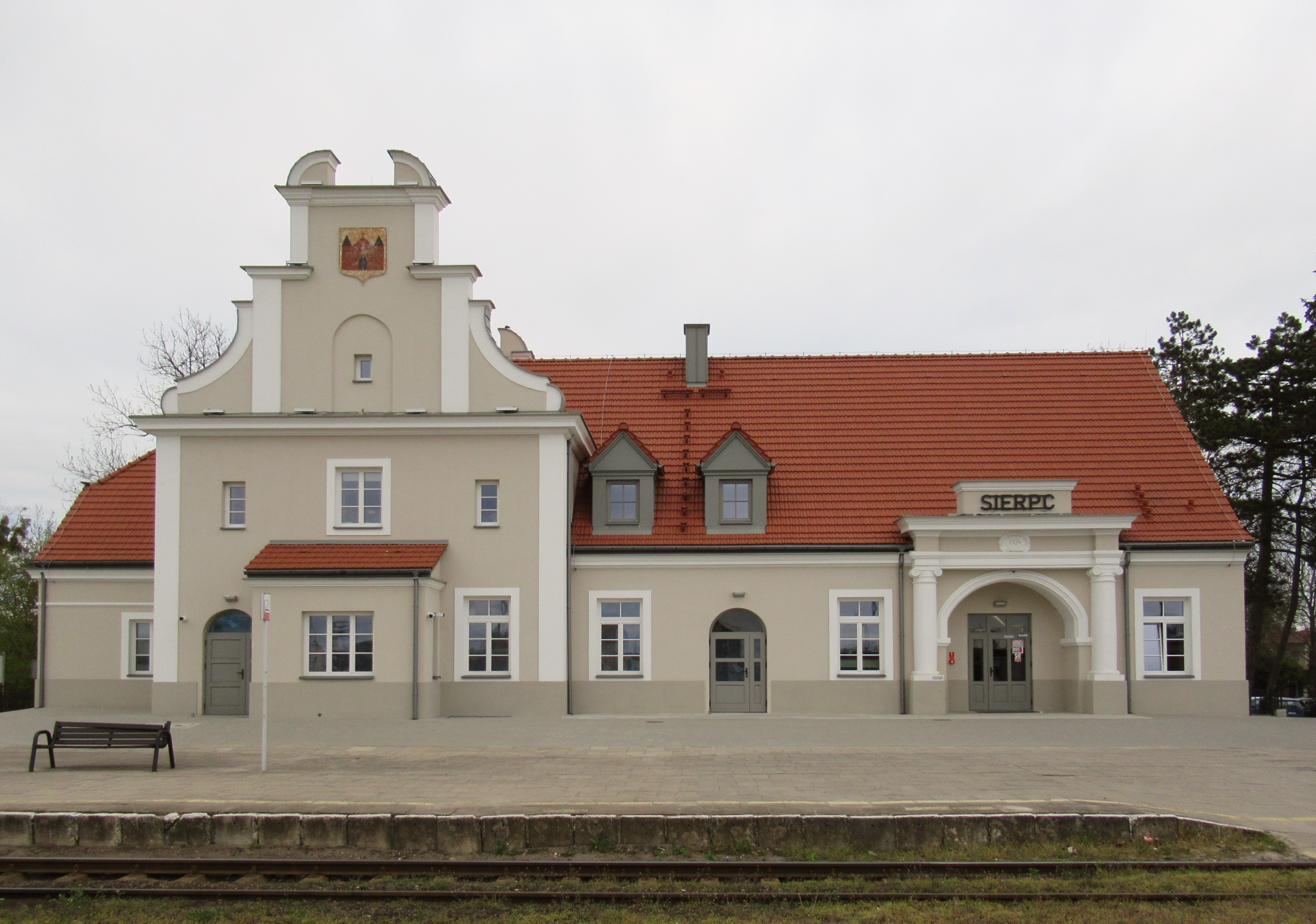

General information
- Location: Sierpc, Sierpc, Masovian; Poland
- Coordinates: 52.8480795°N 19.6532546°E
- System: Rail Station
- Owner: Polskie Koleje Państwowe S.A.

Services
Preceding station	Masovian Railways	Following station
Susk towards Kutno	R31	Terminus
Mieszaki towards Nasielsk	R91	Terminus
Mieszaki towards Warszawa Gdańska	RE91	Terminus
Preceding station	Arriva RP	Following station
Podwierzbie towards Toruń Główny	AR410	Terminus
Location

Sierpc railway station is a railway station in Sierpc, Masovian, Poland. It is served by Masovian Railways.
