= Kątne railway station =

Railway station in Kątne, Poland

Kątne
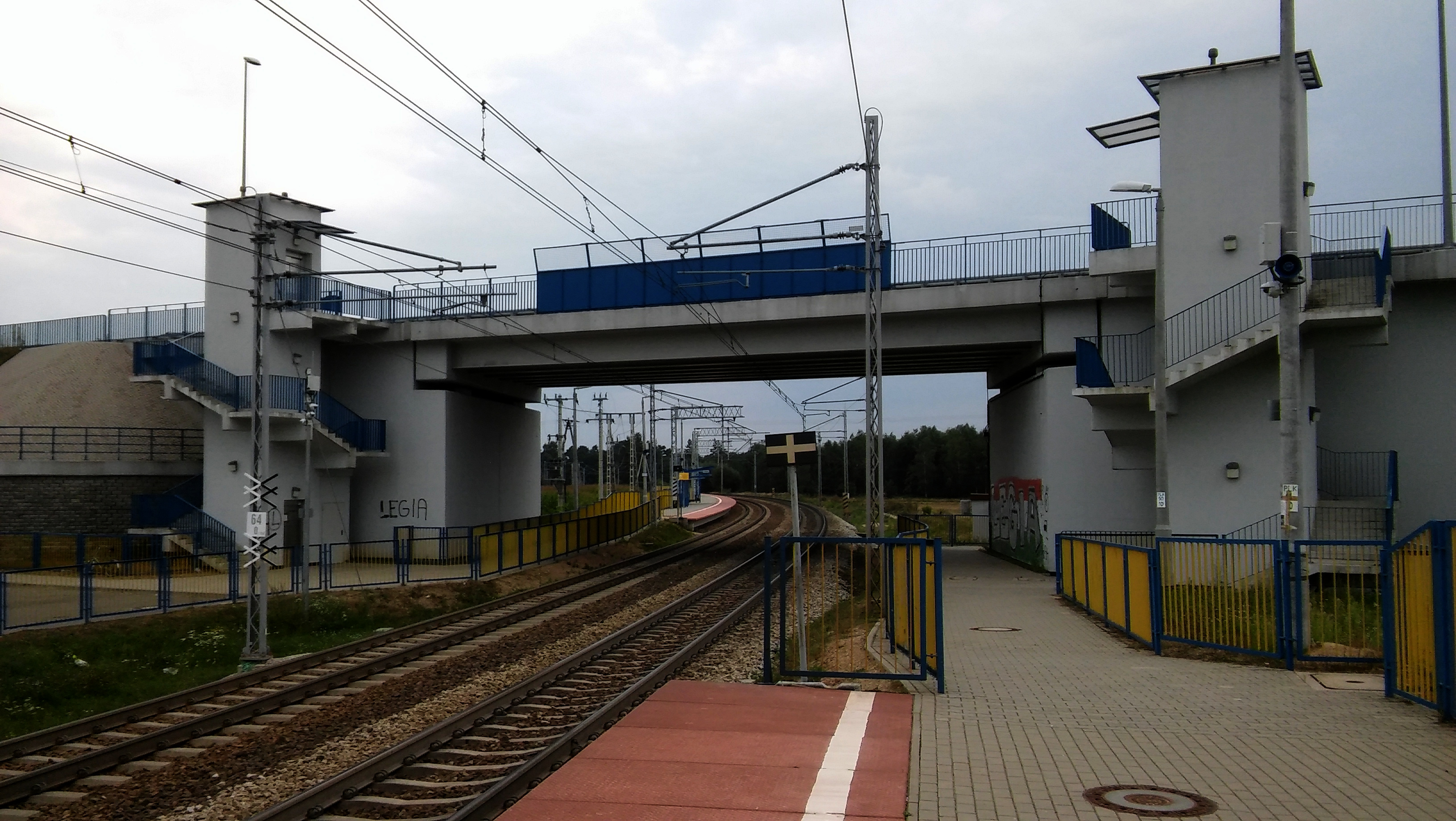
- Station in August 2016

General information
- Location: Kątne, Nasielsk, Nowy Dwór, Masovian; Poland
- Coordinates: 52.6067183°N 20.7623014°E
- System: Rail Station
- Owner: Polskie Koleje Państwowe S.A.

Services
Preceding station	Masovian Railways	Following station
Nasielsk towards Warszawa Zachodnia	R9	Jackowo Dworskie towards Działdowo
Nasielsk towards Warszawa Zachodnia	R90	Jackowo Dworskie towards Działdowo
Location

Kątne railway station is a railway station in Kątne, Nasielsk, Nowy Dwór, Masovian, Poland. It is served by Masovian Railways.
