= Jackowo Dworskie railway station =

Railway station in Jackowo Dworskie, Poland

Jackowo Dworskie
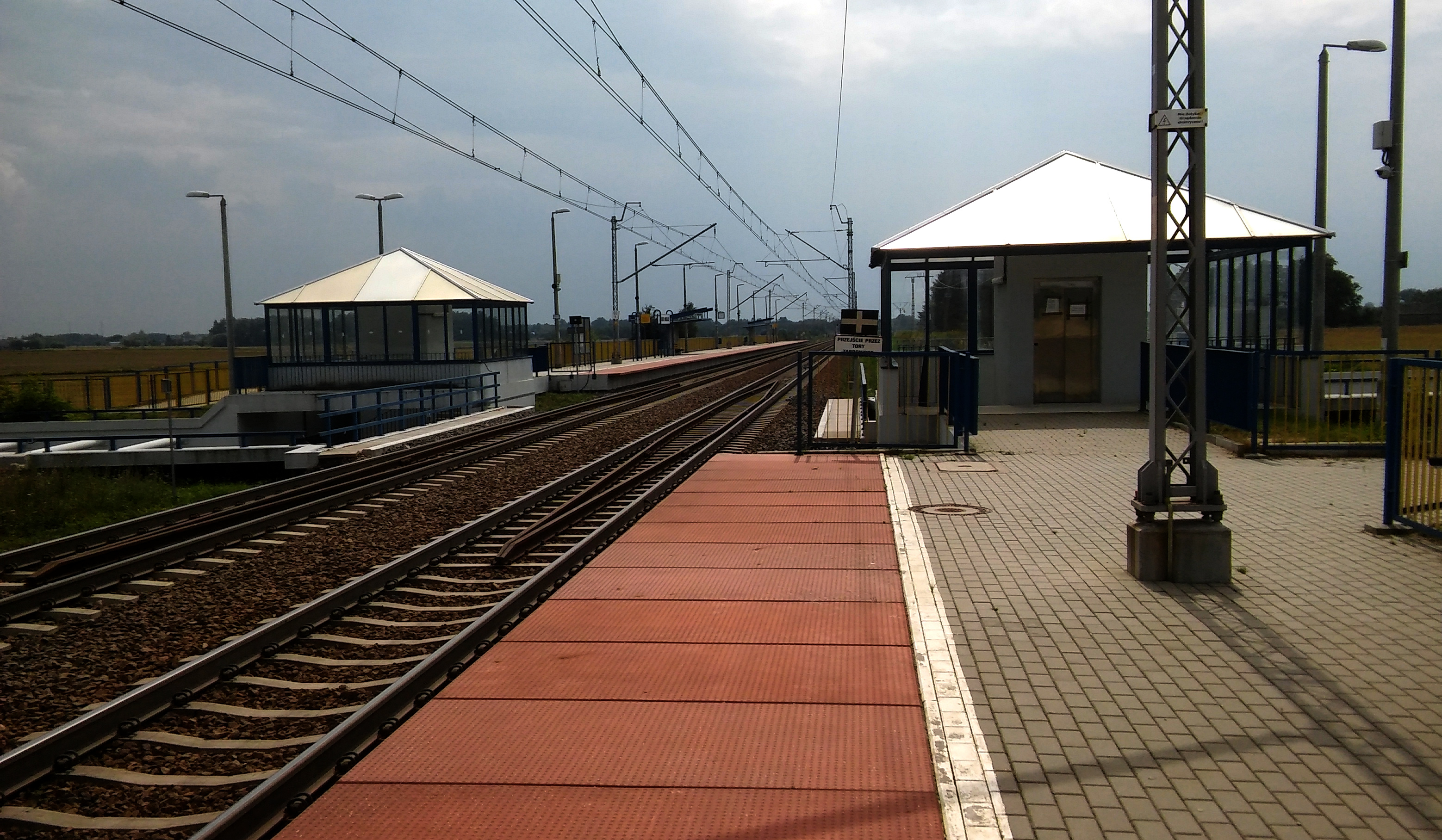

General information
- Location: Jackowo Dworskie, Nasielsk, Nowy Dwór, Masovian; Poland
- Coordinates: 52.6310438°N 20.7751933°E
- System: Rail Station
- Owner: Polskie Koleje Państwowe S.A.

Services
Preceding station	Masovian Railways	Following station
Kątne towards Warszawa Zachodnia	R9	Świercze towards Działdowo
Kątne towards Warszawa Zachodnia	R90	Świercze towards Działdowo
Location

Jackowo Dworskie railway station is a railway station in Jackowo Dworskie, Nasielsk, Nowy Dwór, Masovian, Poland. It is served by Masovian Railways.
