= Świercze railway station =

Railway station in Pułtusk County, Poland

Świercze
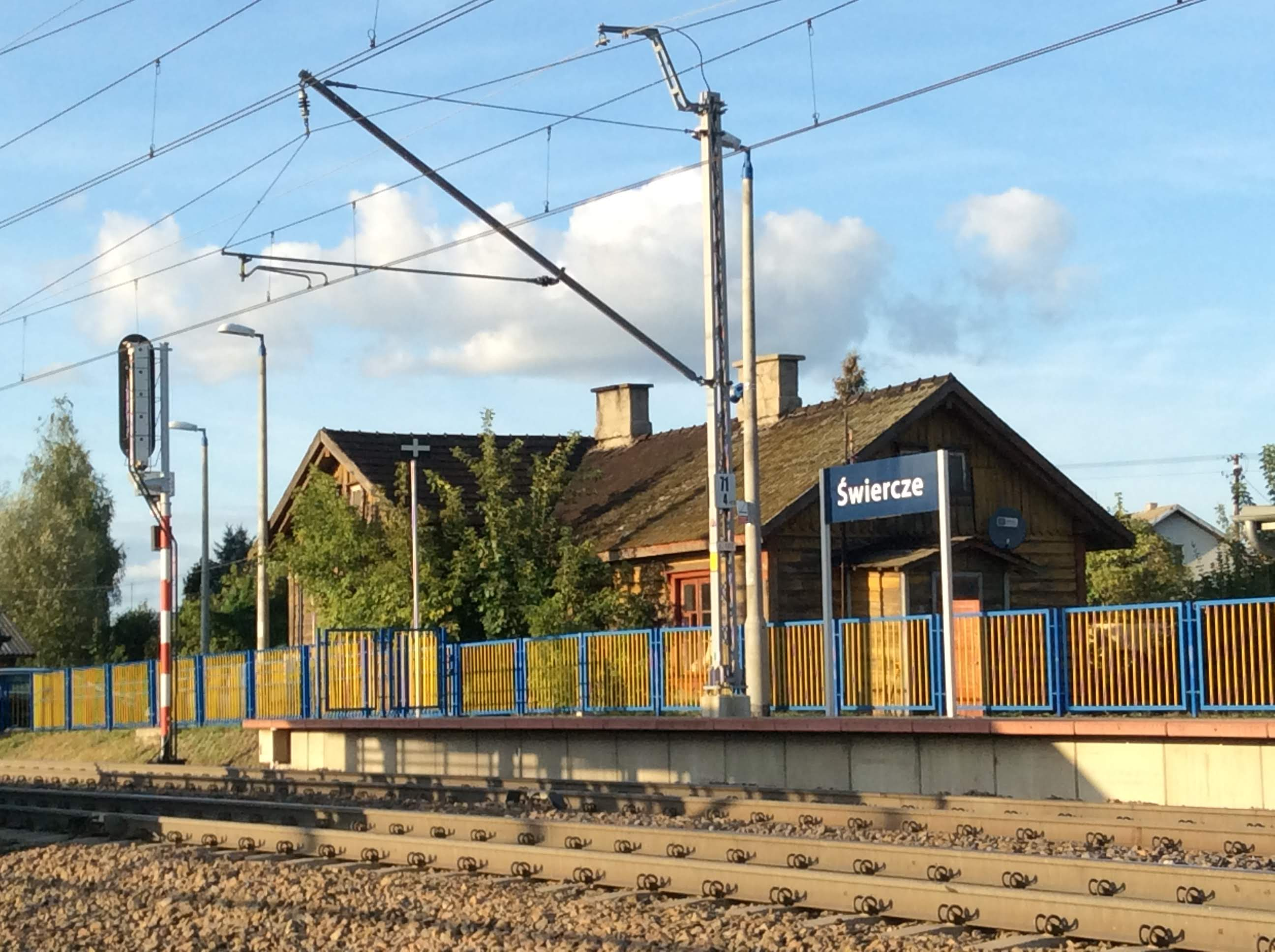
- The station in 2019

General information
- Location: Świercze, Pułtusk County, Pułtusk, Masovian; Poland
- Coordinates: 52.6705649°N 20.7628363°E
- System: Rail Station
- Owner: Polskie Koleje Państwowe S.A.

Services
Preceding station	Masovian Railways	Following station
Jackowo Dworskie towards Warszawa Zachodnia	R9	Kałęczyn towards Działdowo
Jackowo Dworskie towards Warszawa Zachodnia	R90	Kałęczyn towards Działdowo
Nasielsk towards Warszawa Zachodnia	RE9	Gąsocin towards Działdowo
Nasielsk towards Warszawa Zachodnia	RE90	Gąsocin towards Działdowo
Location

Świercze railway station is a railway station in Jackowo Dworskie, Nasielsk, Nowy Dwór, Masovian, Poland. It is served by Masovian Railways.
