= Pianowo-Bargły =

- Village
- Location within Poland
- Coordinates: 52°37′06″N 20°48′55″E
- Country: Poland
- Voivodeship: Masovian
- County: Nowy Dwór
- Gmina: Nasielsk

Pianowo-Bargły [pjaˈnɔvɔ ˈbarɡwɨ] is a village in the administrative district of Gmina Nasielsk, within Nowy Dwór County, Masovian Voivodeship, in east-central Poland.
