= Czajki, Masovian Voivodeship =

Czajki
- Village
- Location within Poland
- Coordinates: 52°33′37″N 20°43′18″E
- Country: Poland
- Voivodeship: Masovian
- County: Nowy Dwór
- Gmina: Nasielsk

Czajki [ˈt͡ʂai̯ki] is a village in the administrative district of Gmina Nasielsk, within Nowy Dwór County, Masovian Voivodeship, in east-central Poland.
