= Janowo, Gmina Zakroczym =

Janowo
- Village
- Location within Poland
- Coordinates: 52°29′N 20°38′E
- Country: Poland
- Voivodeship: Masovian
- County: Nowy Dwór
- Gmina: Zakroczym

Janowo [jaˈnɔvɔ] is a village in the administrative district of Gmina Zakroczym, within Nowy Dwór County, Masovian Voivodeship, in east-central Poland.
