= Lorcin =

Lorcin, Poland
- Village
- Location within Poland
- Coordinates: 52°32′N 20°52′E
- Country: Poland
- Voivodeship: Masovian
- County: Nowy Dwór
- Gmina: Nasielsk

Lorcin [ˈlɔrt͡ɕin] is a village in the administrative district of Gmina Nasielsk, within Nowy Dwór County, Masovian Voivodeship, in east-central Poland.
