= Kałęczyn railway station =

Railway station in Ciechanów County, Poland

Kałęczyn
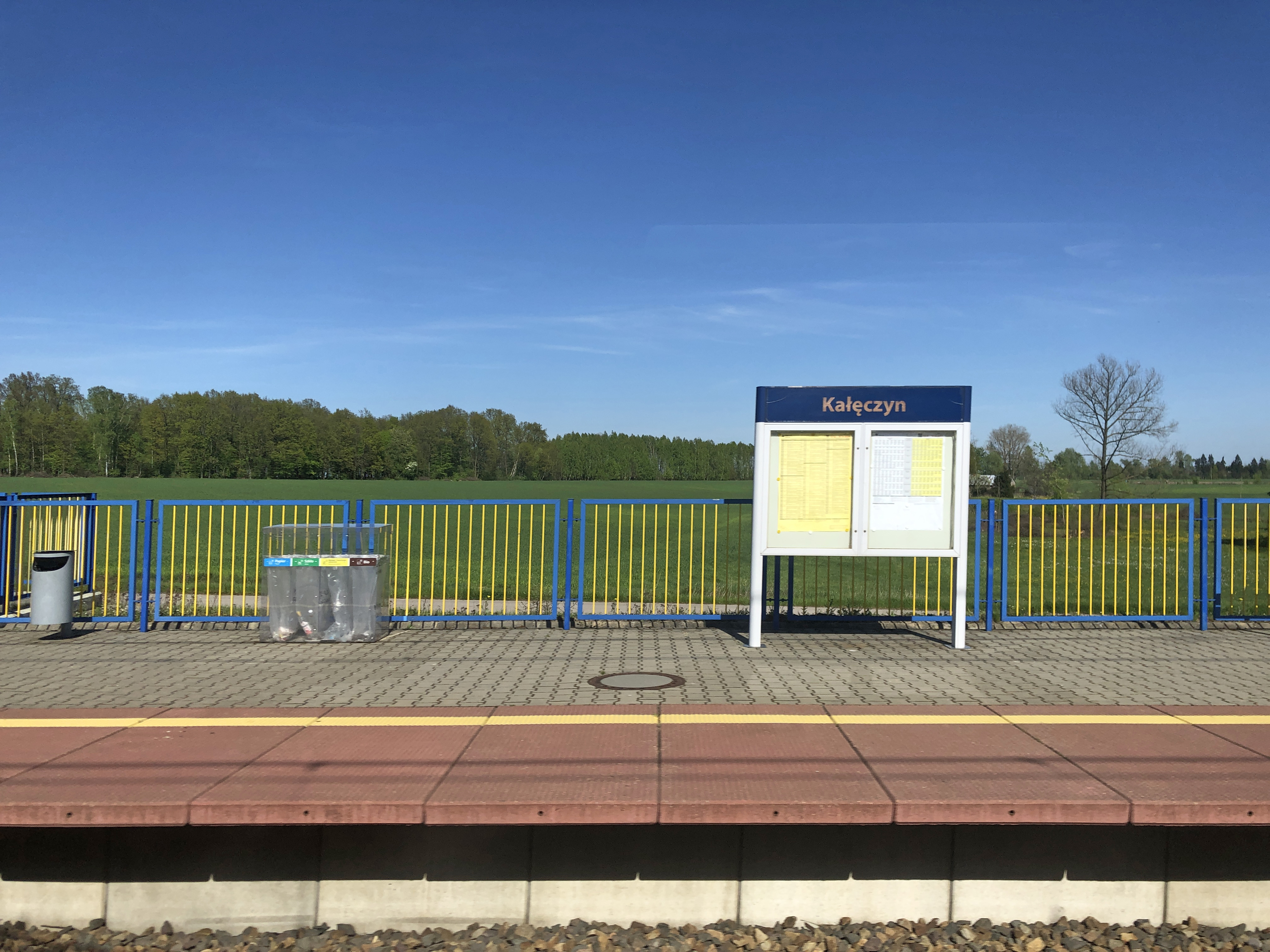

General information
- Location: Kałęczyn, Ciechanów County, Masovian; Poland
- Coordinates: 52.7073664°N 20.74725°E
- System: Rail Station
- Owner: Polskie Koleje Państwowe S.A.

Services
Preceding station	Masovian Railways	Following station
Świercze towards Warszawa Zachodnia	R9	Gąsocin towards Działdowo
Świercze towards Warszawa Zachodnia	R90	Gąsocin towards Działdowo
Location

Kałęczyn railway station is a railway station in Kałęczyn, Ciechanów County, Masovian, Poland. It is served by Masovian Railways.
