= Strubiny =

Strubiny may refer to the following places:

- Strubiny, Gmina Zakroczym, Nowy Dwór County in Masovian Voivodeship (east-central Poland)
- Strubiny, Płońsk County in Masovian Voivodeship (east-central Poland)
- Strubiny, Warmian-Masurian Voivodeship (north Poland)
