= Dobra Wola =

Dobra Wola may refer to the following places:

- Dobra Wola, Kuyavian-Pomeranian Voivodeship (north-central Poland)
- Dobra Wola, Mława County in Masovian Voivodeship (east-central Poland)
- Dobra Wola, Gmina Nasielsk, Nowy Dwór County in Masovian Voivodeship (east-central Poland)
- Dobra Wola, Greater Poland Voivodeship (west-central Poland)
- Dobra Wola, Warmian-Masurian Voivodeship (north Poland)
