= Czarna, Gmina Zakroczym =

Czarna
- Village
- Location within Poland
- Coordinates: 52°31′36″N 20°37′14″E
- Country: Poland
- Voivodeship: Masovian
- County: Nowy Dwór
- Gmina: Zakroczym

Czarna [ˈt͡ʂarna] is a village in the administrative district of Gmina Zakroczym, within Nowy Dwór County, Masovian Voivodeship, in east-central Poland.
