= Henrysin =

Henrysin may refer to the following places:

- Henrysin, Lublin Voivodeship (east Poland)
- Henrysin, Gmina Zakroczym, Nowy Dwór County in Masovian Voivodeship (east-central Poland)
- Henrysin, Sokołów County in Masovian Voivodeship (east-central Poland)
- Henrysin, Wyszków County in Masovian Voivodeship (east-central Poland)
