= Morgi, Gmina Nasielsk =

Morgi
- Village
- Location within Poland
- Coordinates: 52°34′N 20°44′E
- Country: Poland
- Voivodeship: Masovian
- County: Nowy Dwór
- Gmina: Nasielsk

Morgi [ˈmɔrɡi] is a village in the administrative district of Gmina Nasielsk, within Nowy Dwór County, Masovian Voivodeship, in east-central Poland.
