= Młodzianowo, Gmina Nasielsk =

Młodzianowo
- Village
- Location within Poland
- Coordinates: 52°32′53″N 20°49′53″E
- Country: Poland
- Voivodeship: Masovian
- County: Nowy Dwór
- Gmina: Nasielsk

Młodzianowo [mwɔd͡ʑaˈnɔvɔ] is a village in the administrative district of Gmina Nasielsk, within Nowy Dwór County, Masovian Voivodeship, in east-central Poland.
