= Aleksandrowo, Gmina Nasielsk =

Aleksandrowo
- Village
- Location within Poland
- Coordinates: 52°32′4″N 20°48′2″E
- Country: Poland
- Voivodeship: Masovian
- County: Nowy Dwór
- Gmina: Nasielsk

Aleksandrowo [alɛksanˈdrɔvɔ] is a village in the administrative district of Gmina Nasielsk, within Nowy Dwór County, Masovian Voivodeship, in east-central Poland.
