= Gąsocin railway station =

Railway station in Gąsocin, Poland

Gąsocin
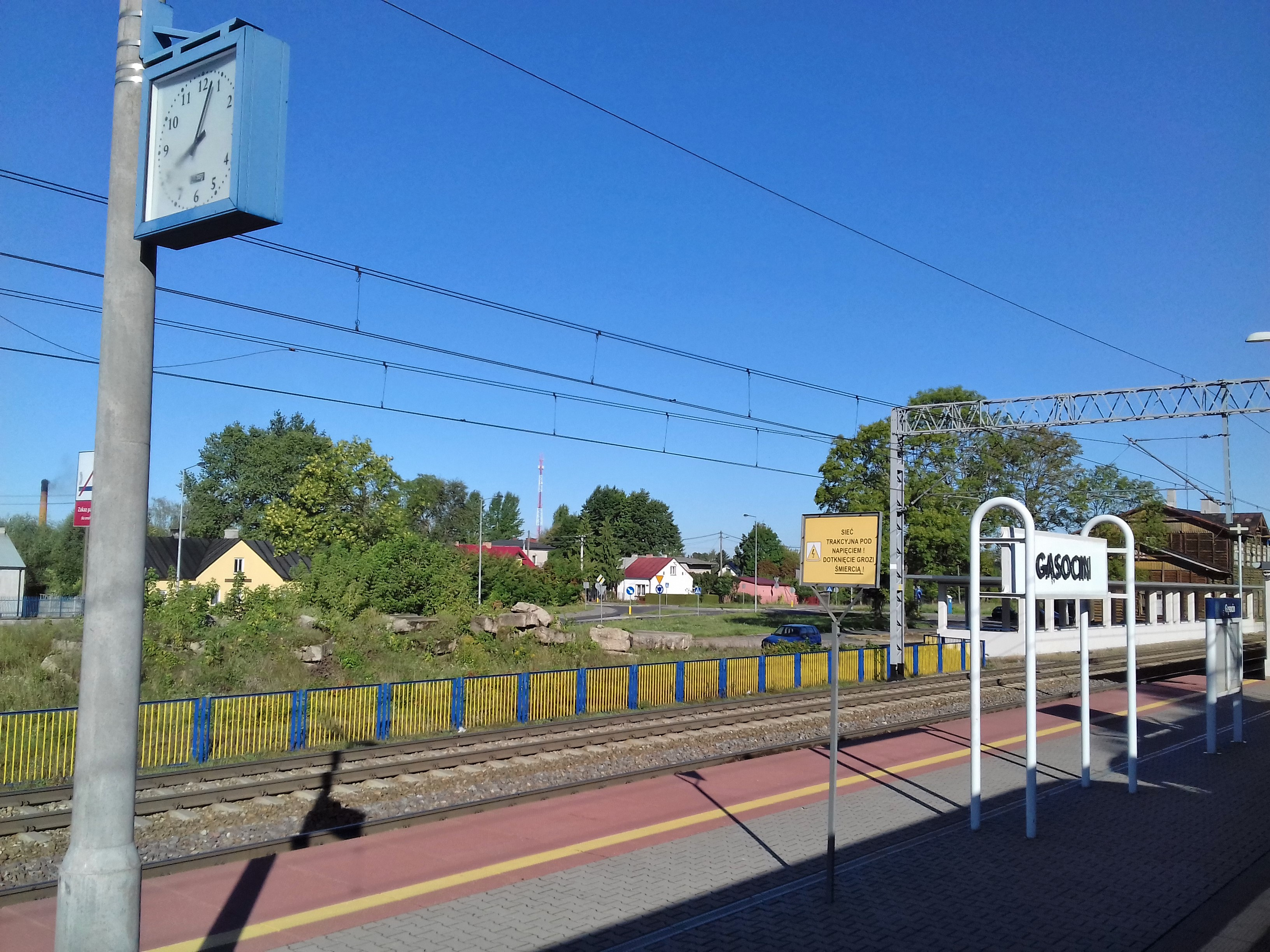

General information
- Location: Gąsocin, Sońsk, Ciechanów, Masovian; Poland
- Coordinates: 52.7380661°N 20.7215372°E
- System: Rail Station
- Owner: Polskie Koleje Państwowe S.A.

Services
Preceding station	Masovian Railways	Following station
Kałęczyn towards Warszawa Zachodnia	R9	Gołotczyzna towards Działdowo
Kałęczyn towards Warszawa Zachodnia	R90	Gołotczyzna towards Działdowo
Świercze towards Warszawa Zachodnia	RE9	Gołotczyzna towards Działdowo
Świercze towards Warszawa Zachodnia	RE90	Gołotczyzna towards Działdowo
Location

Gąsocin railway station is a railway station in Gąsocin, Ciechanów, Masovian, Poland. It is served by the regional rail operator, Masovian Railways.

The station is located on the eastern edge of Gąsocin village.

== Historics ==
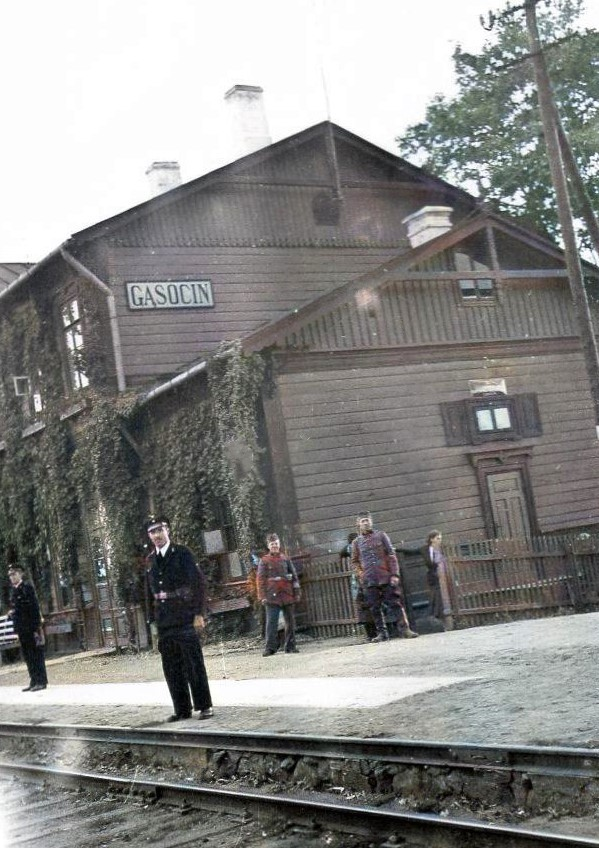
Station 1940

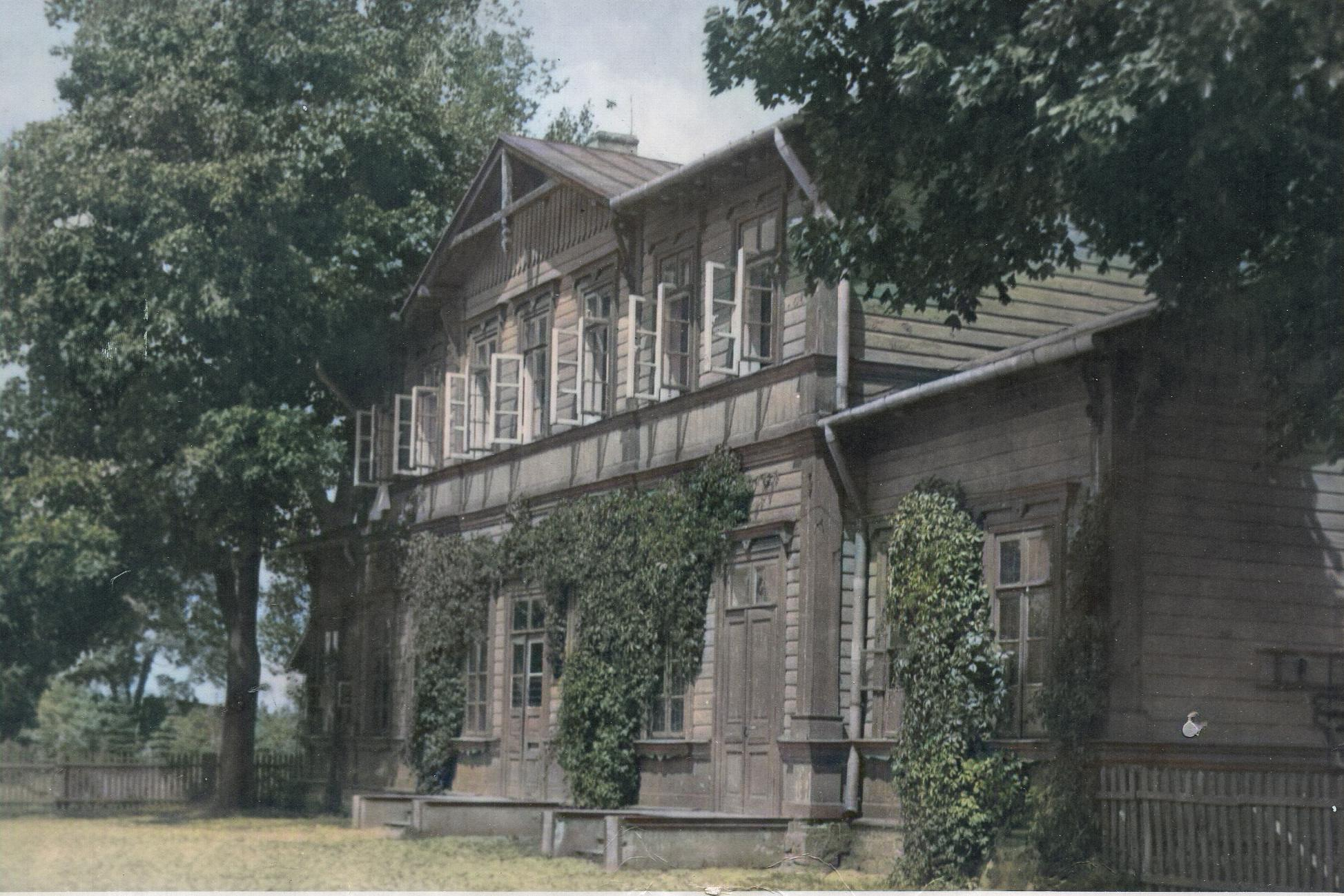
Street view 1940
