= Błogosławie =

- Village
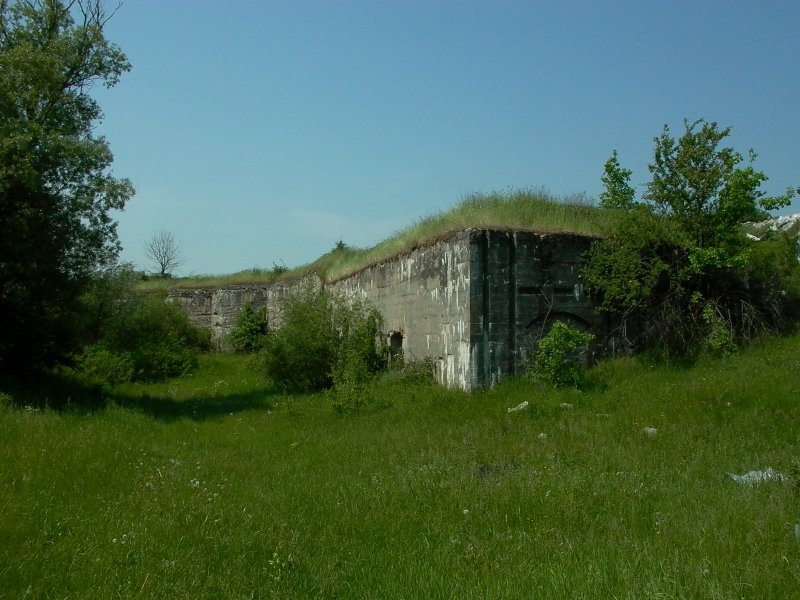
- The anti-scarp caponier of the XIII Modlin Fortress

- Coat of arms

- Location within Poland
- Coordinates: 52°29′56″N 20°38′00″E
- Country: Poland
- Voivodeship: Masovian
- County: Nowy Dwór
- Gmina: Zakroczym
- Population: 80

Błogosławie [bwɔɡɔˈswavjɛ] is a village in the administrative district of Gmina Zakroczym, within Nowy Dwór County, Masovian Voivodeship, in east-central Poland.
