= Broninek =

- Village
- Location within Poland
- Coordinates: 52°36′34″N 20°48′15″E
- Country: Poland
- Voivodeship: Masovian
- County: Nowy Dwór
- Gmina: Nasielsk

Broninek [brɔˈninɛk] is a village in the administrative district of Gmina Nasielsk, within Nowy Dwór County, Masovian Voivodeship, in east-central Poland.
