= Nowa Wrona, Gmina Nasielsk =

Nowa Wrona
- Village
- Location within Poland
- Coordinates: 52°33′59″N 20°36′26″E
- Country: Poland
- Voivodeship: Masovian
- County: Nowy Dwór
- Gmina: Nasielsk

Nowa Wrona [ˈnɔva ˈvrɔna] is a village in the administrative district of Gmina Nasielsk, within Nowy Dwór County, Masovian Voivodeship, in east-central Poland.
