= Mazewo Dworskie A =

- Village
- Location within Poland
- Coordinates: 52°37′04″N 20°44′46″E
- Country: Poland
- Voivodeship: Masovian
- County: Nowy Dwór
- Gmina: Nasielsk
- Population: 212

Mazewo Dworskie A is a village in the administrative district of Gmina Nasielsk, within Nowy Dwór County, Masovian Voivodeship, in east-central Poland..

== Population ==
Historical population
Year	Pop.	±% p.a.
2011	204	—
2021	212	+0.39%
Source: City Population
