= Siennica, Gmina Nasielsk =

Siennica
- Village
- Location within Poland
- Coordinates: 52°34′27″N 20°47′30″E
- Country: Poland
- Voivodeship: Masovian
- County: Nowy Dwór
- Gmina: Nasielsk
- Population: 360

Siennica [ɕɛnˈnit͡sa] is a village in the administrative district of Gmina Nasielsk, within Nowy Dwór County, Masovian Voivodeship, in east-central Poland.
