= Nowiny, Gmina Nasielsk =

Nowiny
- Village
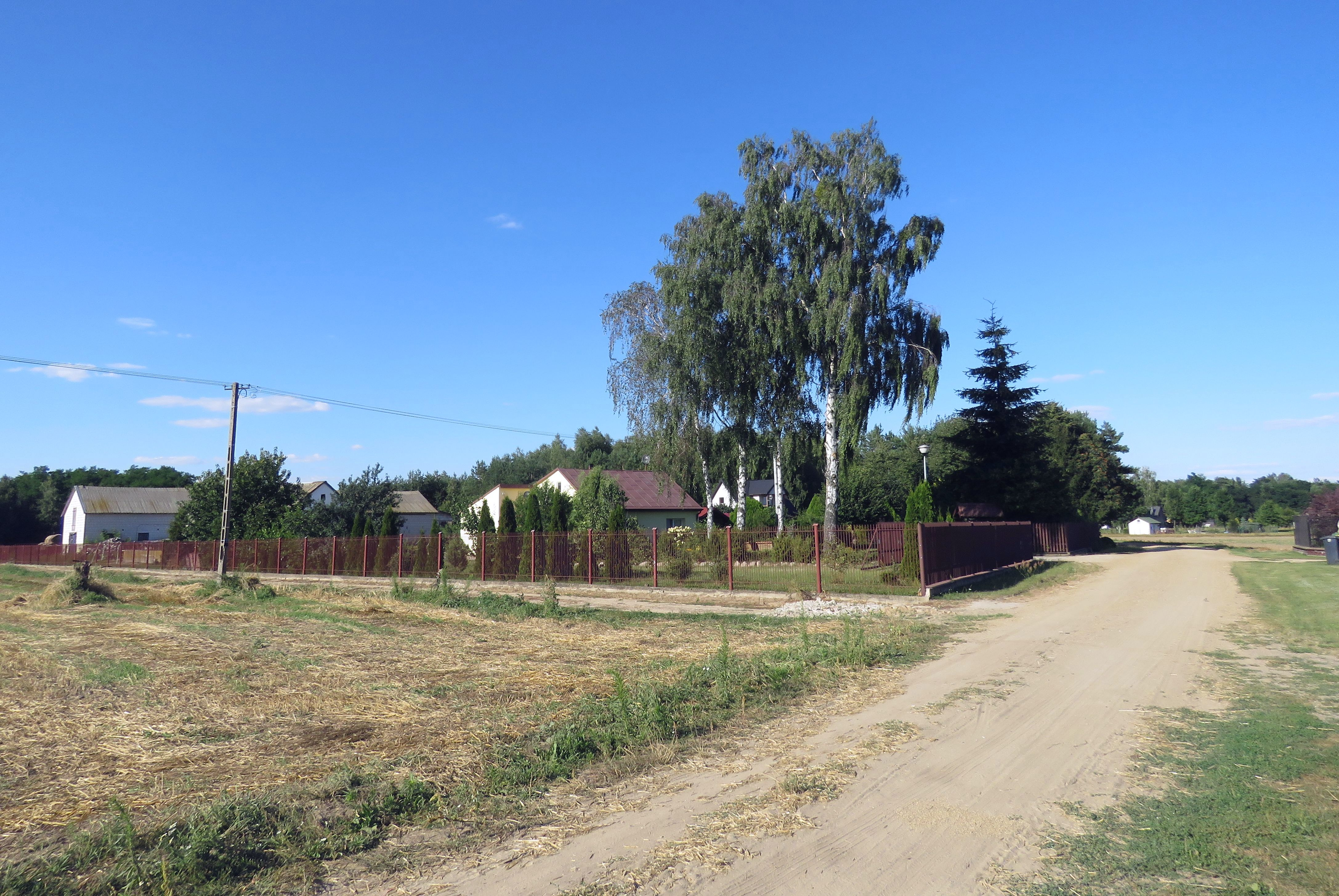
- Road in Nowiny

- Location within Poland
- Coordinates: 52°32′30″N 20°38′56″E
- Country: Poland
- Voivodeship: Masovian
- County: Nowy Dwór
- Gmina: Nasielsk

Nowiny [nɔˈvinɨ] is a village in the administrative district of Gmina Nasielsk, within Nowy Dwór County, Masovian Voivodeship, in east-central Poland.
