= Pianowo-Daczki =

- Village
- Location within Poland
- Coordinates: 52°37′11″N 20°49′25″E
- Country: Poland
- Voivodeship: Masovian
- County: Nowy Dwór
- Gmina: Nasielsk

Pianowo-Daczki [pjaˈnɔvɔ ˈdat͡ʂki] is a village in the administrative district of Gmina Nasielsk, within Nowy Dwór County, Masovian Voivodeship, in east-central Poland.
