= Śniadowo, Masovian Voivodeship =

Śniadowo
- Village
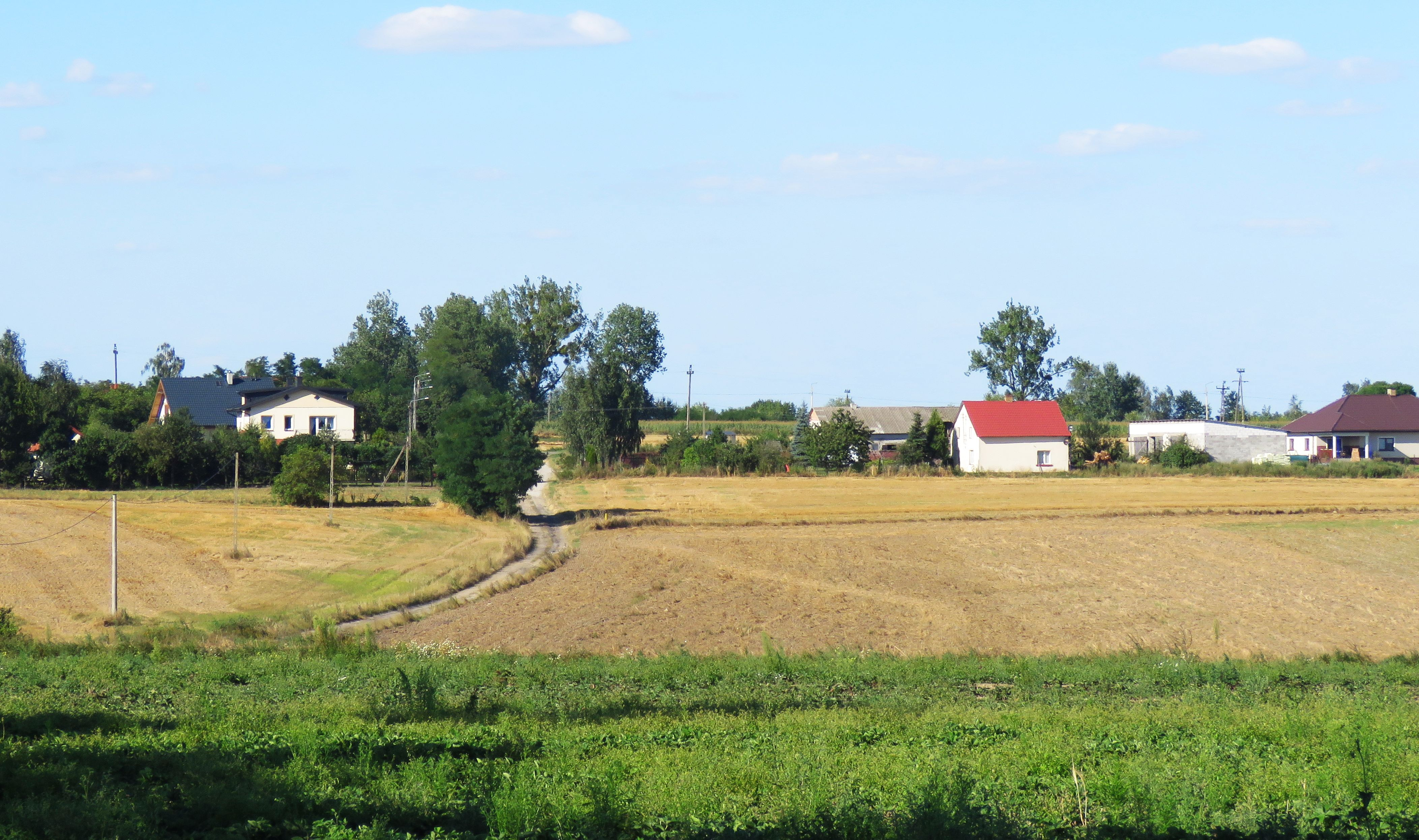

- Location within Poland
- Coordinates: 52°31′N 20°39′E
- Country: Poland
- Voivodeship: Masovian
- County: Nowy Dwór
- Gmina: Zakroczym

Population
  - Total: 110
- Time zone: UTC+1 (CET)
  - Summer (DST): UTC+2 (CEST)
- Vehicle registration: WND

Śniadowo [ɕɲaˈdɔvɔ] is a village in the administrative district of Gmina Zakroczym, within Nowy Dwór County, Masovian Voivodeship, in east-central Poland.
