= Wągrodno =

Wągrodno may refer to the following places in Poland:

- Wągrodno, Lower Silesian Voivodeship (south-west Poland)
- Wągrodno, Gmina Nasielsk, Nowy Dwór County in Masovian Voivodeship (east-central Poland)
- Wągrodno, Piaseczno County in Masovian Voivodeship (east-central Poland)
- Wągrodno, West Pomeranian Voivodeship (north-west Poland)
