= Popowo-Południe =

- Village
- Location within Poland
- Coordinates: 52°41′13″N 19°25′27″E
- Country: Poland
- Voivodeship: Masovian
- County: Nowy Dwór
- Gmina: Nasielsk

Popowo-Południe [pɔˈpɔvɔ pɔˈwudɲɛ] is a village in the administrative district of Gmina Nasielsk, within Nowy Dwór County, Masovian Voivodeship, in east-central Poland.
