= Nowa Wieś, Gmina Nasielsk =

Nowa Wieś
- Village
- Location within Poland
- Coordinates: 52°35′N 20°48′E
- Country: Poland
- Voivodeship: Masovian
- County: Nowy Dwór
- Gmina: Nasielsk

Nowa Wieś [ˈnɔva ˈvjɛɕ] is a village in the administrative district of Gmina Nasielsk, within Nowy Dwór County, Masovian Voivodeship, in east-central Poland.
