= Nuna, Poland =

Nuna
- Village
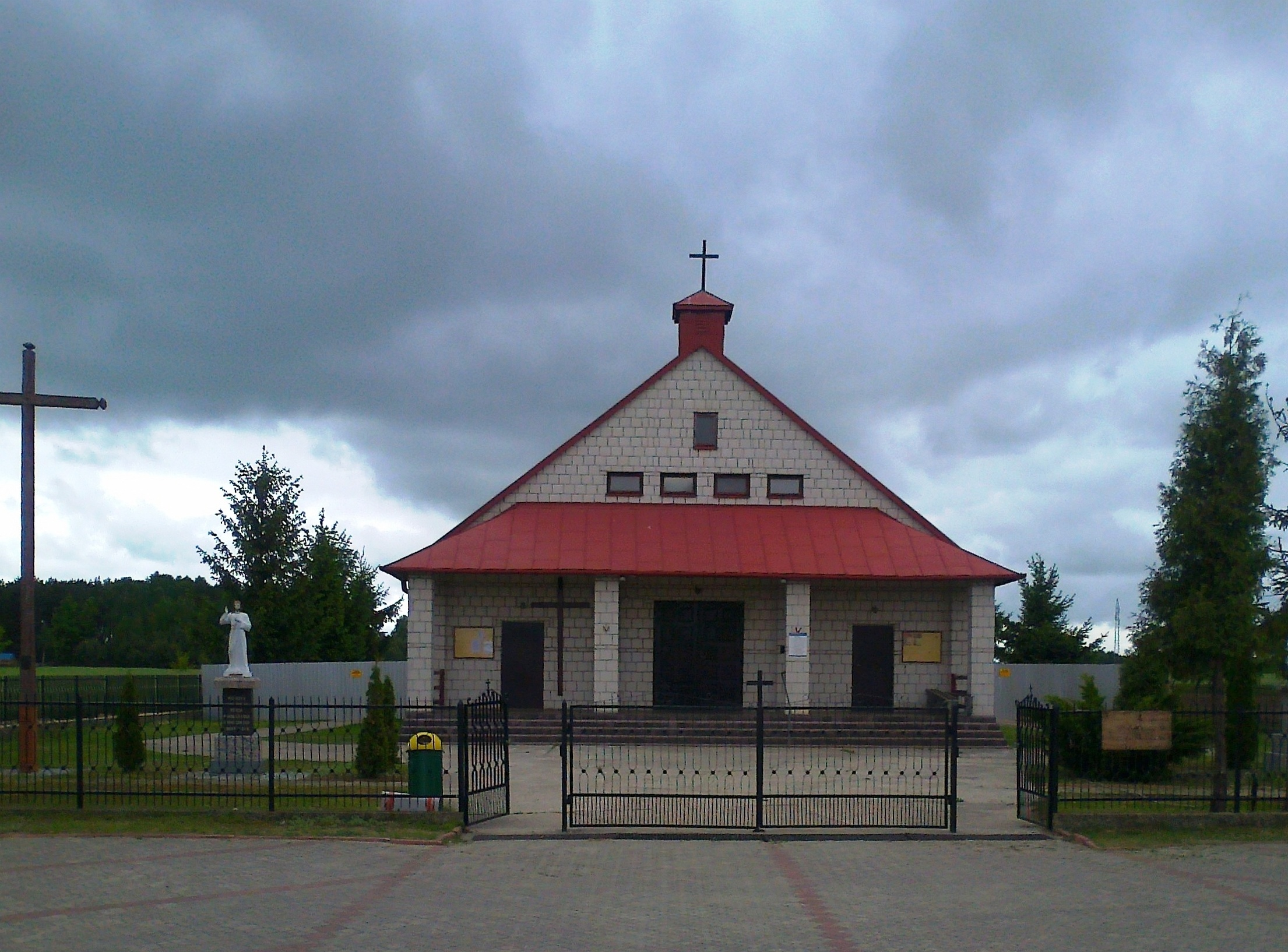
- Jerzy Popiełuszko church in Nuna

- Location within Poland
- Coordinates: 52°32′N 20°52′E
- Country: Poland
- Voivodeship: Masovian
- County: Nowy Dwór
- Gmina: Nasielsk

Nuna [ˈnuna] is a village in the administrative district of Gmina Nasielsk, within Nowy Dwór County, Masovian Voivodeship, in east-central Poland.
