= Mokrzyce Włościańskie =

- Village
- Location within Poland
- Coordinates: 52°34′24″N 20°42′32″E
- Country: Poland
- Voivodeship: Masovian
- County: Nowy Dwór
- Gmina: Nasielsk

Mokrzyce Włościańskie (Polish pronunciation: [mɔˈkʂɨtsɛ vwɔɕˈtɕaj̃skʲɛ]) is a village in the administrative district of Gmina Nasielsk, within Nowy Dwór County, Masovian Voivodeship, in east-central Poland.
