= Borkowo, Masovian Voivodeship =

Borkowo
- Village
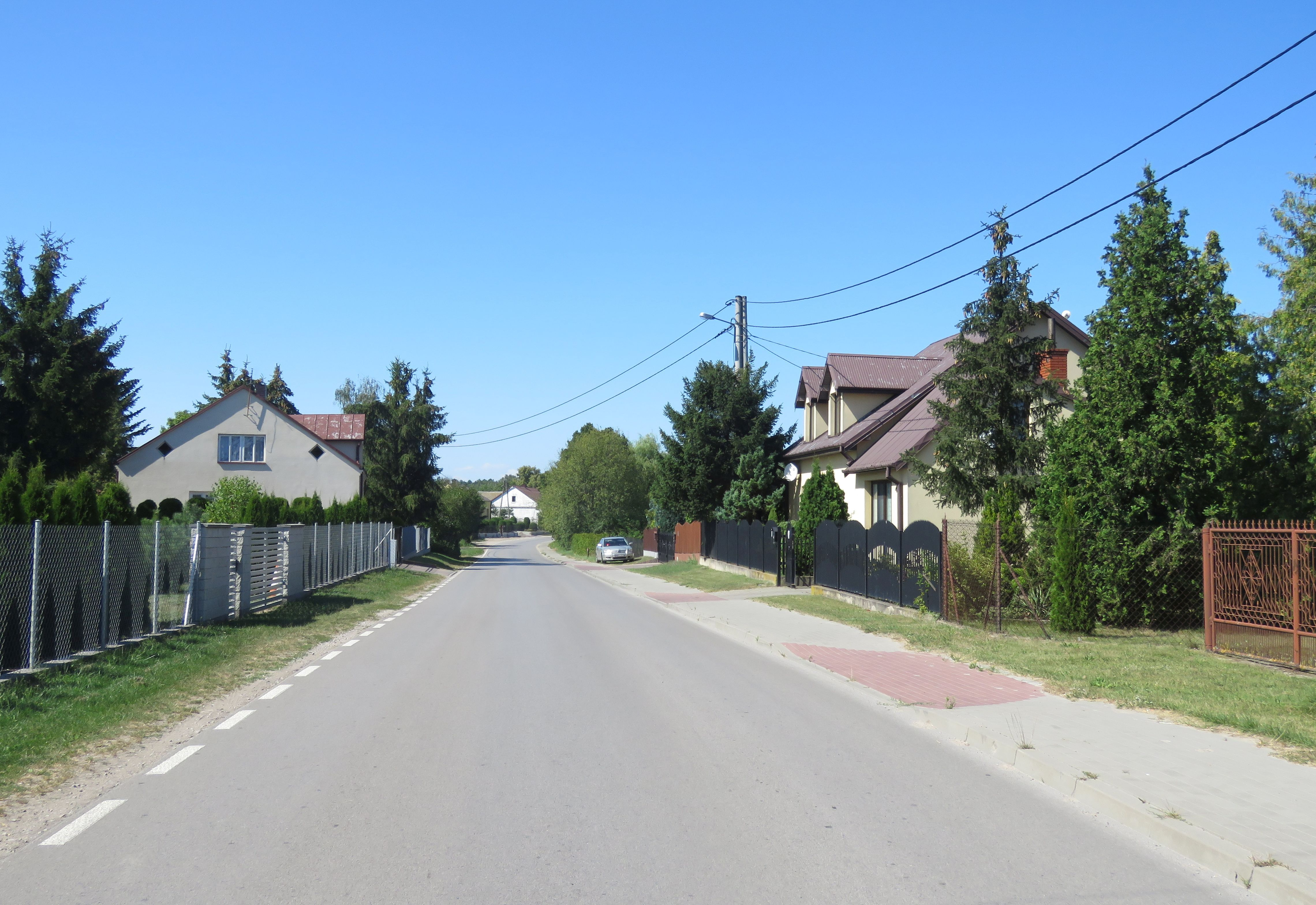
- Street in Borkowo

- Location within Poland
- Coordinates: 52°34′N 20°40′E
- Country: Poland
- Voivodeship: Masovian
- County: Nowy Dwór
- Gmina: Nasielsk

Borkowo [bɔrˈkɔvɔ] is a village in the administrative district of Gmina Nasielsk, within Nowy Dwór County, Masovian Voivodeship, in east-central Poland.
