= Wiktorowo, Gmina Nasielsk =

Wiktorowo
- Village
- Location within Poland
- Coordinates: 52°34′52″N 20°41′46″E
- Country: Poland
- Voivodeship: Masovian
- County: Nowy Dwór
- Gmina: Nasielsk

Wiktorowo [viktɔˈrɔvɔ] is a village in the administrative district of Gmina Nasielsk, within Nowy Dwór County, Masovian Voivodeship, in east-central Poland.
