= Stare Pieścirogi =

- Village
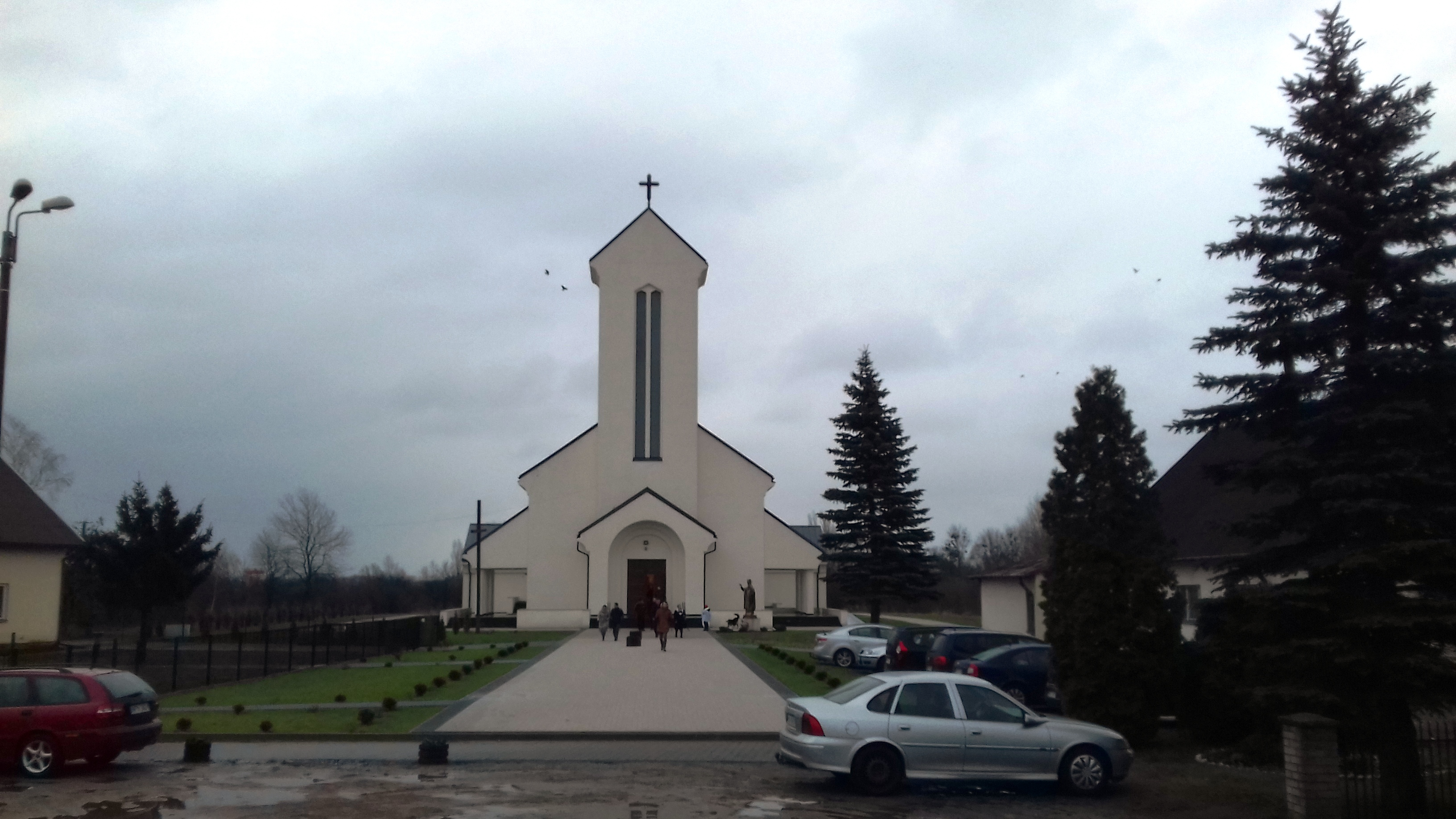
- Church in Stare Pieścirogi

- Location within Poland
- Coordinates: 52°35′N 20°45′E
- Country: Poland
- Voivodeship: Masovian
- County: Nowy Dwór
- Gmina: Nasielsk
- Population (approx.): 1,000

Stare Pieścirogi [ˈstarɛ pjɛɕt͡ɕiˈrɔɡi] is a village in the administrative district of Gmina Nasielsk, within Nowy Dwór County, Masovian Voivodeship, in east-central Poland.
