= Winniki =

Winniki may refer to the following places:

- Winniki, Masovian Voivodeship (east-central Poland)
- Winniki, Opole Voivodeship (south-west Poland)
- Winniki, West Pomeranian Voivodeship (north-west Poland)
- Polish name for Vynnyky, a city in Ukraine
