= Lubomin, Gmina Nasielsk =

Lubomin
- Village
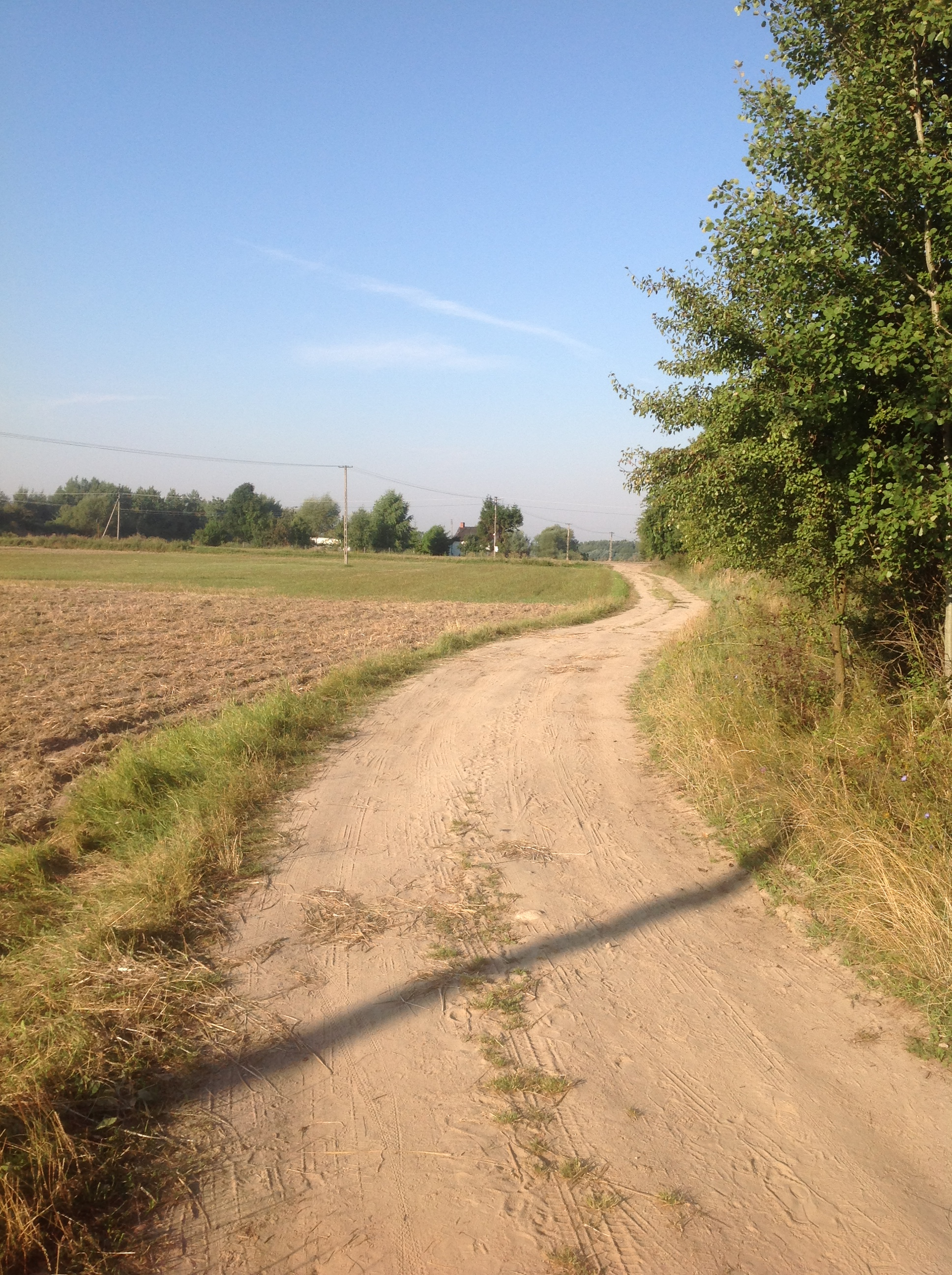
- Trail in Lubomin

- Location within Poland
- Coordinates: 52°37′58″N 20°45′40″E
- Country: Poland
- Voivodeship: Masovian
- County: Nowy Dwór
- Gmina: Nasielsk

Lubomin [luˈbɔmin] is a village in the administrative district of Gmina Nasielsk, within Nowy Dwór County, Masovian Voivodeship, in east-central Poland.
