= Trębki Stare =

- Village
- Location within Poland
- Coordinates: 52°28′N 20°32′E
- Country: Poland
- Voivodeship: Masovian
- County: Nowy Dwór
- Gmina: Zakroczym
- Population (2011): 411
- Zip code: 05-170
- Area code: 22
- Vehicle registration: WND

Trębki Stare [ˈtrɛmpki ˈstarɛ] is a village in the administrative district of Gmina Zakroczym, within Nowy Dwór County, Masovian Voivodeship, in east-central Poland.

In 1975–1998, the village belonged to the Warsaw Voivodeship.

== Demographics ==
Demographic structure as of March 31, 2011
	In general	Pre-working age	Working age	Post-working age
Male	210	50	149	11
Female	201	54	113	34
Both	411	104	262	45
