= Krzyczki-Pieniążki =

- Village
- Location within Poland
- Coordinates: 52°35′29″N 20°52′39″E
- Country: Poland
- Voivodeship: Masovian
- County: Nowy Dwór
- Gmina: Nasielsk

Krzyczki-Pieniążki [ˈkʂɨt͡ʂki pjɛˈɲɔ̃ʂki] is a village in the administrative district of Gmina Nasielsk, within Nowy Dwór County, Masovian Voivodeship, in east-central Poland.
