= Mogowo =

- Village
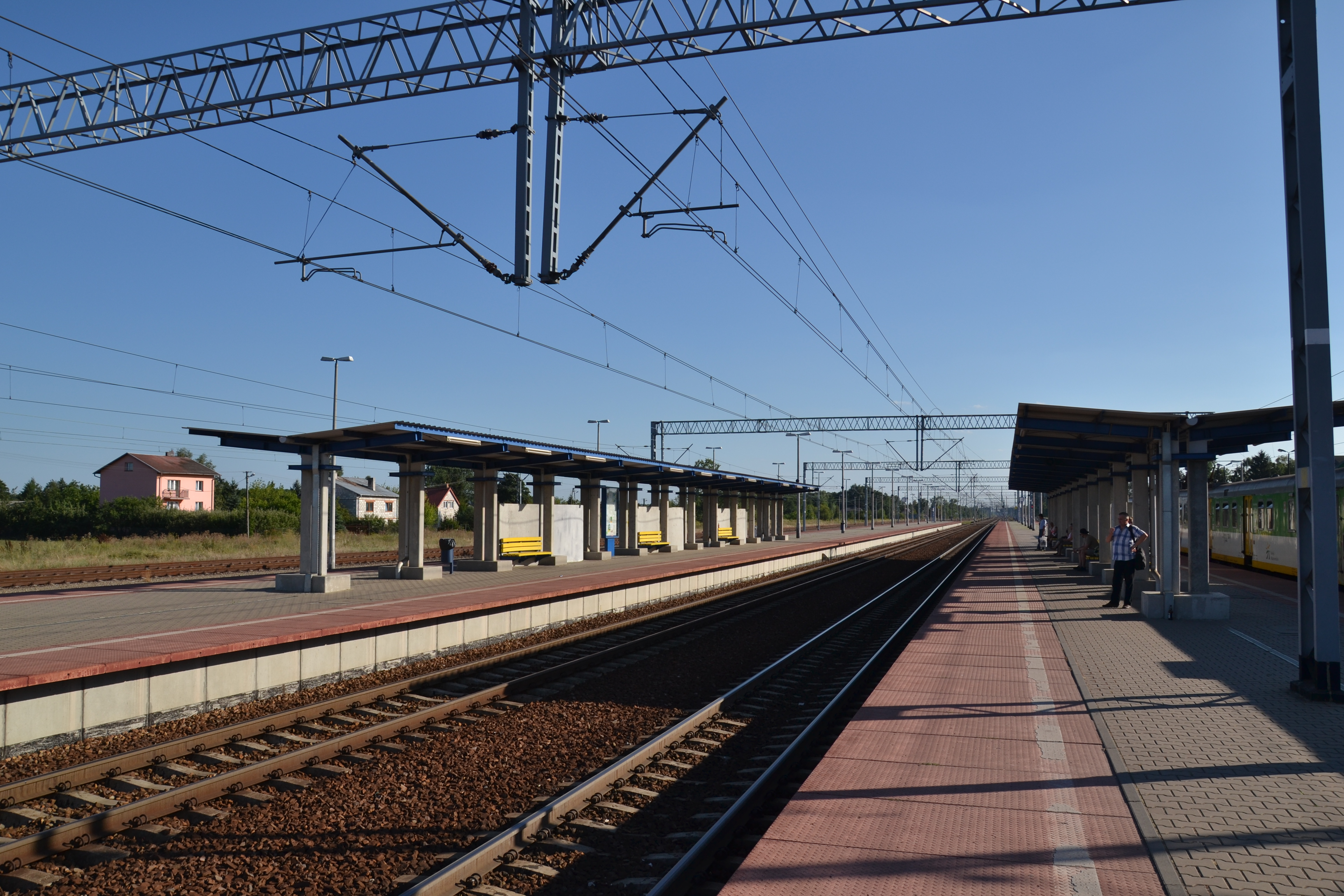
- Train station in Mogowo

- Location within Poland
- Coordinates: 52°33′58″N 20°46′0″E
- Country: Poland
- Voivodeship: Masovian
- County: Nowy Dwór
- Gmina: Nasielsk
- Population: 600

Mogowo [mɔˈɡɔvɔ] is a village in the administrative district of Gmina Nasielsk, within Nowy Dwór County, Masovian Voivodeship, in east-central Poland.
