= Krzyczki-Żabiczki =

- Village
- Location within Poland
- Coordinates: 52°35′21″N 20°51′55″E
- Country: Poland
- Voivodeship: Masovian
- County: Nowy Dwór
- Gmina: Nasielsk

Krzyczki-Żabiczki [ˈkʂɨt͡ʂki ʐaˈbit͡ʂki] is a village in the administrative district of Gmina Nasielsk, within Nowy Dwór County, Masovian Voivodeship, in east-central Poland.
