= Kosewo, Gmina Nasielsk =

Kosewo
- Village
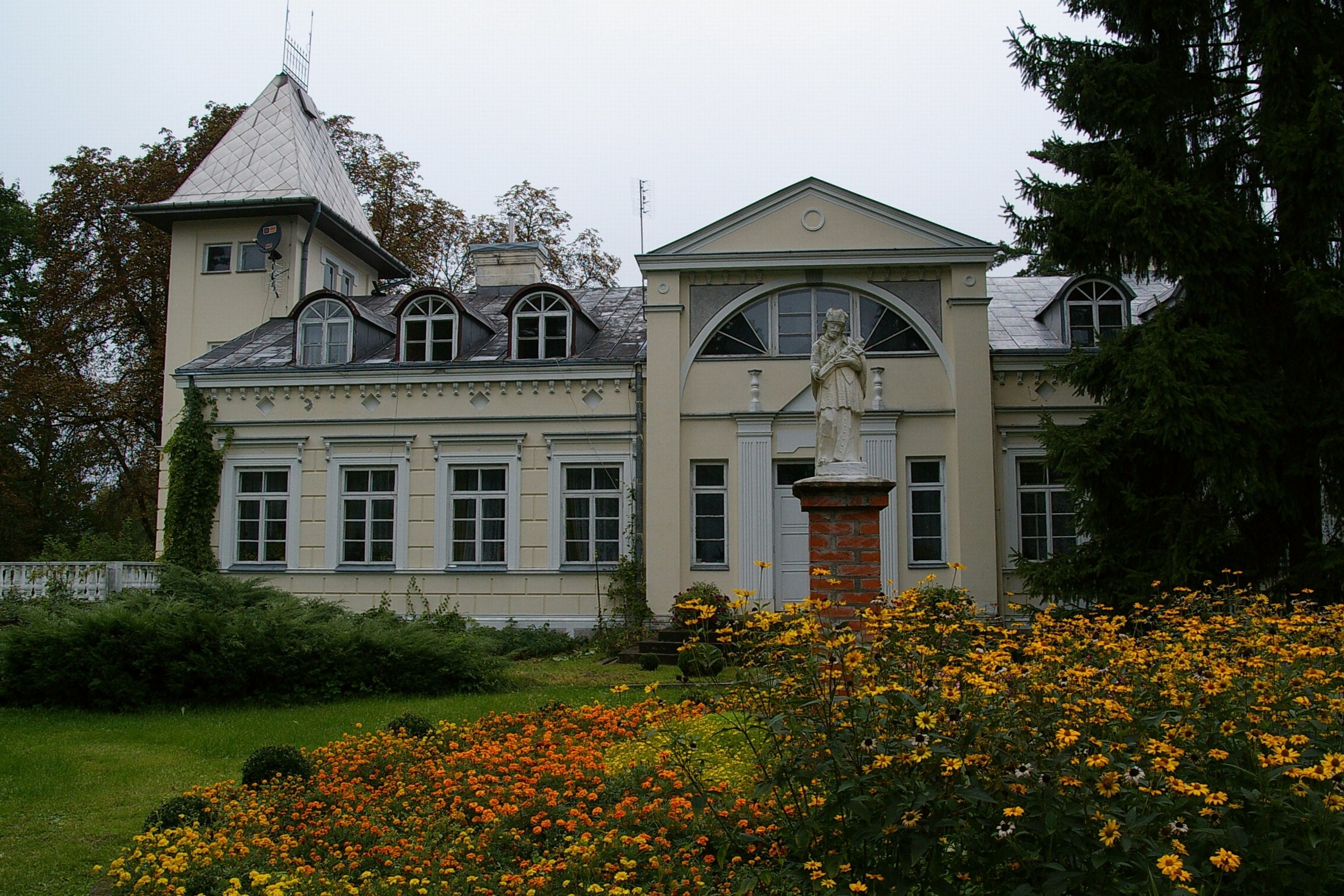
- Manor in Kosewo

- Location within Poland
- Coordinates: 52°35′41″N 20°46′12″E
- Country: Poland
- Voivodeship: Masovian
- County: Nowy Dwór
- Gmina: Nasielsk

Kosewo (Polish pronunciation: [kɔˈsɛvɔ]) is a village in the administrative district of Gmina Nasielsk, within Nowy Dwór County, Masovian Voivodeship, in east-central Poland.
