= Mochty-Smok =

- Village
- Location within Poland
- Coordinates: 52°26′00″N 20°31′00″E
- Country: Poland
- Voivodeship: Masovian
- County: Nowy Dwór
- Gmina: Zakroczym

Mochty-Smok [ˈmɔxtɨ ˈsmɔk] is a village in the administrative district of Gmina Zakroczym, within Nowy Dwór County, Masovian Voivodeship, in east-central Poland.
