= Smoszewo =

- Village
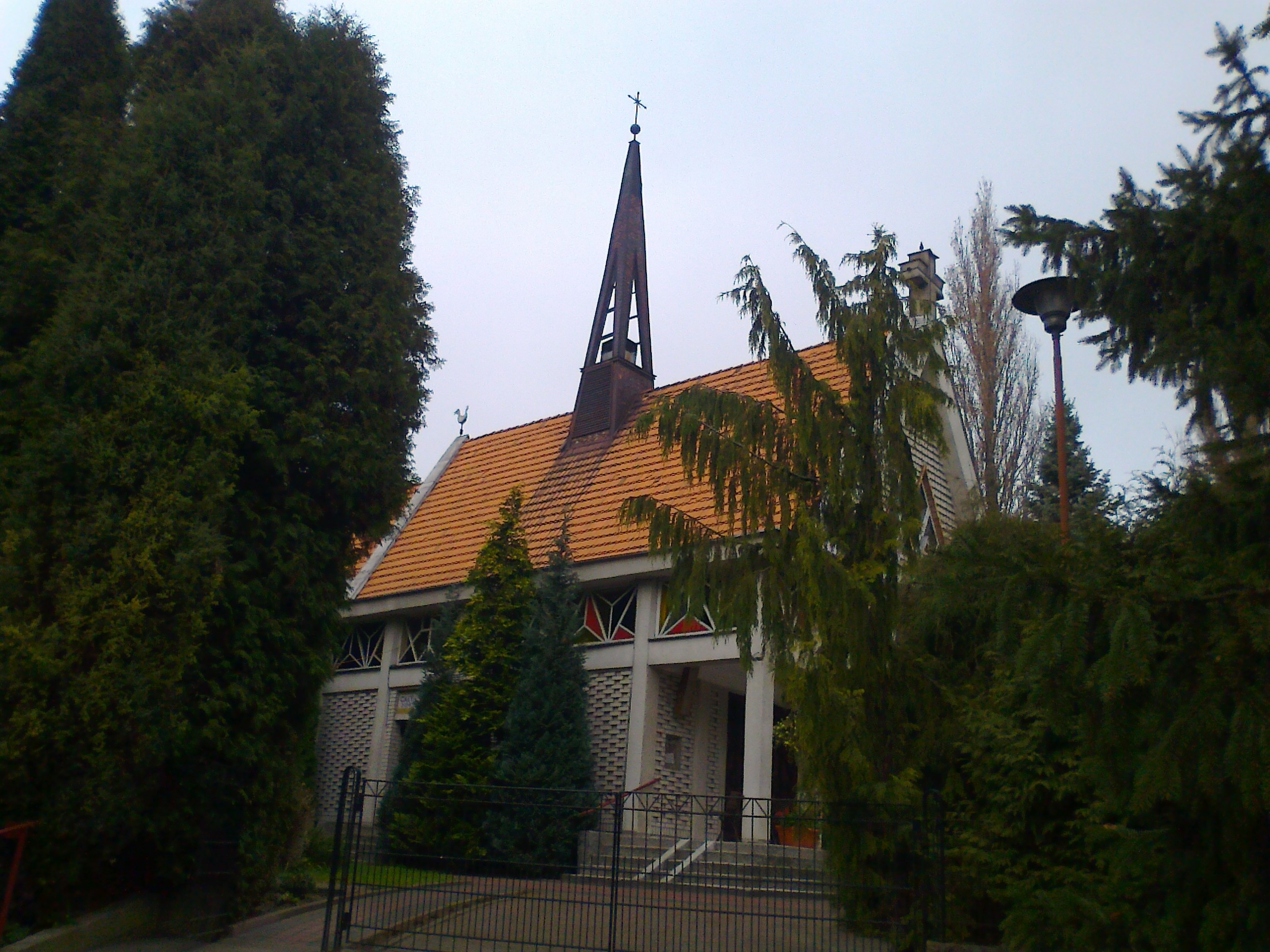

- Location within Poland
- Coordinates: 52°25′42″N 20°29′58″E
- Country: Poland
- Voivodeship: Masovian
- County: Nowy Dwór
- Gmina: Zakroczym

Smoszewo [smɔˈʂɛvɔ] is a village in the administrative district of Gmina Zakroczym, within Nowy Dwór County, Masovian Voivodeship, in east-central Poland.
