= Ruszkowo =

Ruszkowo may refer to the following places:

- Ruszkowo, Lipno County in Kuyavian-Pomeranian Voivodeship (north-central Poland)
- Ruszkowo, Rypin County in Kuyavian-Pomeranian Voivodeship (north-central Poland)
- Ruszkowo, Ciechanów County in Masovian Voivodeship (east-central Poland)
- Ruszkowo, Gmina Nasielsk, Nowy Dwór County in Masovian Voivodeship (east-central Poland)
- Ruszkowo, Greater Poland Voivodeship (west-central Poland)
- Ruszkowo, Warmian-Masurian Voivodeship (north Poland)
