= Dębinki =

Dębinki may refer to the following places:

- Dębinki, Lublin Voivodeship (east Poland)
- Dębinki, Legionowo County in Masovian Voivodeship (east-central Poland)
- Dębinki, Gmina Nasielsk, Nowy Dwór County in Masovian Voivodeship (east-central Poland)
- Dębinki, Wyszków County in Masovian Voivodeship (east-central Poland)
