= Strubiny, Gmina Zakroczym =

Strubiny
- Village
- Location within Poland
- Coordinates: 52°28′34″N 20°35′36″E
- Country: Poland
- Voivodeship: Masovian
- County: Nowy Dwór
- Gmina: Zakroczym

Strubiny [struˈbinɨ] is a village in the administrative district of Gmina Zakroczym, within Nowy Dwór County, Masovian Voivodeship, in east-central Poland.
