= Gmina Zakroczym =

Gmina Zakroczym Zakroczym Commune
- Gmina
- Coat of arms
- Interactive map of Gmina Zakroczym
- Coordinates (Zakroczym): 52°26′N 20°37′E
- Country: Poland
- Voivodeship: Masovian
- County: Nowy Dwór
- Seat: Zakroczym

Area
  - Total: 71.42 km^{2} (27.58 sq mi)

Population (2011)
  - Total: 6,253
  - Density: 87.55/km^{2} (226.8/sq mi)
  - Urban: 3,279
  - Rural: 2,974
- Website: www.zakroczym.pl

Gmina Zakroczym is an urban-rural gmina (administrative district) in Nowy Dwór County, Masovian Voivodeship, in east-central Poland. Its seat is the town of Zakroczym, which lies approximately 5 kilometres (3 mi) west of Nowy Dwór Mazowiecki and 36 km (22 mi) north-west of Warsaw.

The gmina covers an area of 71.42 square kilometres (27.6 sq mi), and as of 2006 its total population is 6,277 (out of which the population of Zakroczym amounts to 3,367, and the population of the rural part of the gmina is 2,910).

== Villages ==
Apart from the town of Zakroczym, Gmina Zakroczym contains the villages and settlements of Błogosławie, Czarna, Emolinek, Henrysin, Janowo, Mochty-Smok, Smoły, Smoszewo, Śniadowo, Strubiny, Swobodnia, Trębki Stare, Wojszczyce, Wólka Smoszewska, Wygoda Smoszewska and Zaręby.

== Neighbouring gminas ==
Gmina Zakroczym is bordered by the town of Nowy Dwór Mazowiecki and by the gminas of Czerwińsk nad Wisłą, Czosnów, Joniec, Leoncin, Nasielsk, Pomiechówek and Załuski.
