= Kątne =

- Village
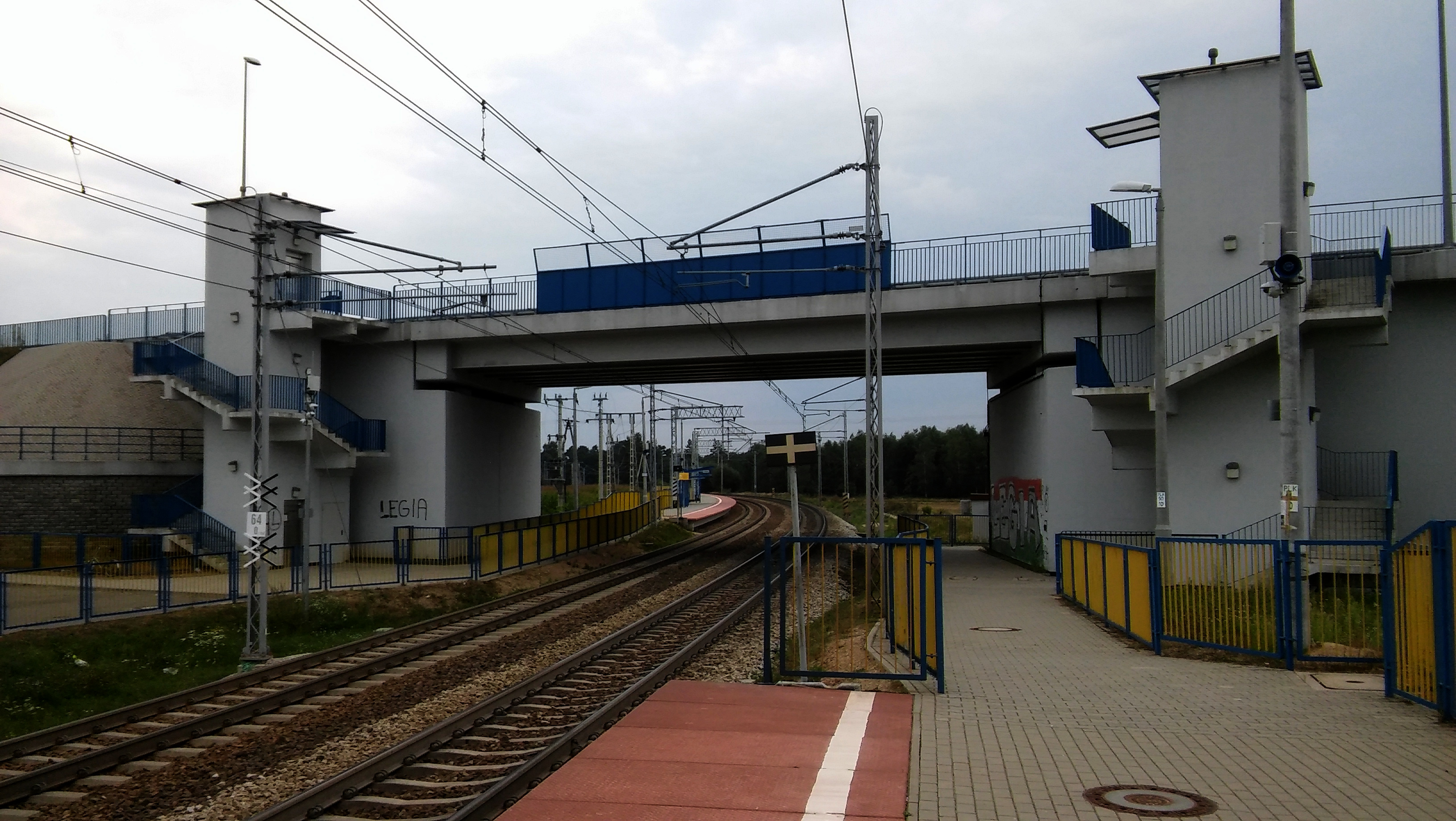
- Train station in Kątne

- Location within Poland
- Coordinates: 52°37′N 20°45′E
- Country: Poland
- Voivodeship: Masovian
- County: Nowy Dwór
- Gmina: Nasielsk

Kątne [ˈkɔntnɛ] is a village in the administrative district of Gmina Nasielsk, within Nowy Dwór County, Masovian Voivodeship, in east-central Poland.
