= Jackowo Dworskie =

- Village
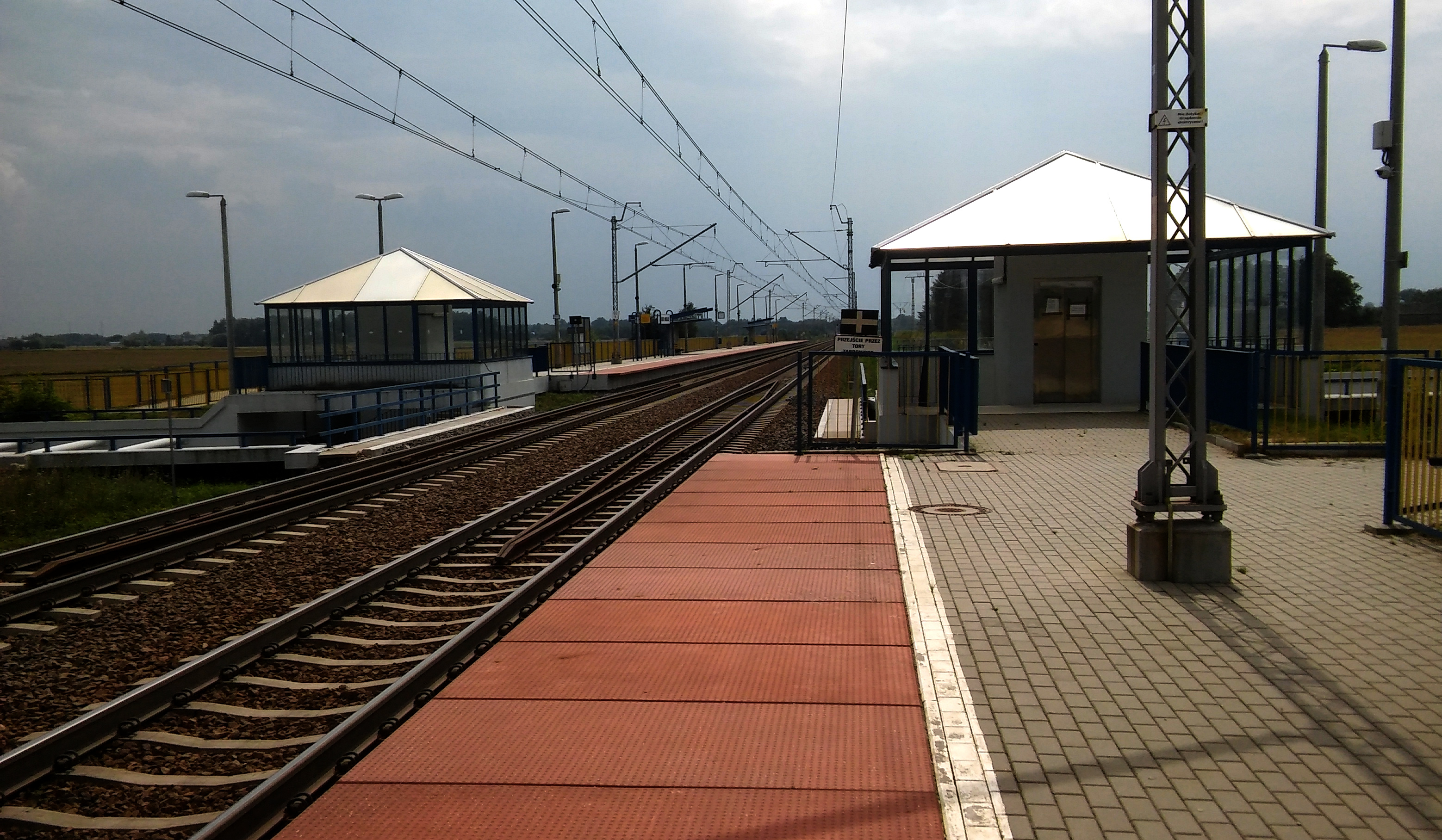
- Train station in Dworskie

- Location within Poland
- Coordinates: 52°37′49″N 20°47′27″E
- Country: Poland
- Voivodeship: Masovian
- County: Nowy Dwór
- Gmina: Nasielsk

Jackowo Dworskie [jat͡sˈkɔvɔ ˈdvɔrskʲɛ] is a village in the administrative district of Gmina Nasielsk, within Nowy Dwór County, Masovian Voivodeship, in east-central Poland.
