= Gąsocin =

- Village
- Saint Maximilian Kolbe church in Gąsocin

- Location within Poland
- Coordinates: 52°44′29″N 20°42′47″E
- Country: Poland
- Voivodeship: Masovian
- County: Ciechanów
- Gmina: Sońsk
- Elevation: 112 m (367 ft)

Population
  - Total: 1,238
- Time zone: UTC+1 (CET)
  - Summer (DST): UTC+2 (CEST)
- Vehicle registration: WCI

Gąsocin [ɡɔ̃ˈsɔt͡ɕin] is a village in the administrative district of Gmina Sońsk, within Ciechanów County, Masovian Voivodeship, in north-central Poland.

Three Polish citizens were murdered by Nazi Germany in the village during World War II.
