= Kałęczyn, Ciechanów County =

Kałęczyn
- Village
- Location within Poland
- Coordinates: 52°42′26″N 20°44′19″E
- Country: Poland
- Voivodeship: Masovian
- County: Ciechanów
- Gmina: Sońsk
- Population: 46

Kałęczyn [kaˈwɛnt͡ʂɨn] is a village in the administrative district of Gmina Sońsk, within Ciechanów County, Masovian Voivodeship, in east-central Poland.
