= Gmina Nasielsk =

Gmina Nasielsk Nasielsk Commune
- Gmina
- Flag Coat of arms
- Interactive map of Gmina Nasielsk
- Coordinates (Nasielsk): 52°36′N 20°48′E
- Country: Poland
- Voivodeship: Masovian
- County: Nowy Dwór
- Seat: Nasielsk

Area
  - Total: 202.47 km^{2} (78.17 sq mi)

Population (2011)
  - Total: 19,727
  - Density: 97.432/km^{2} (252.35/sq mi)
  - Urban: 7,617
  - Rural: 12,110
- Website: um.nasielsk.pl

Gmina Nasielsk is an urban-rural gmina (administrative district) in Nowy Dwór County, Masovian Voivodeship, in east-central Poland. Its seat is the town of Nasielsk, which lies approximately 21 kilometres (13 mi) north-east of Nowy Dwór Mazowiecki and 45 km (28 mi) north of Warsaw.

The gmina covers an area of 202.47 square kilometres (78.2 sq mi), and as of 2006 its total population is 19,259 (out of which the population of Nasielsk amounts to 7,364, and the population of the rural part of the gmina is 11,895).

== Villages ==
Apart from the town of Nasielsk, Gmina Nasielsk contains the villages and settlements of Aleksandrowo, Andzin, Borkowo, Broninek, Budy Siennickie, Cegielnia Psucka, Chechnówka, Chlebiotki, Chrcynno, Cieksyn, Czajki, Dąbrowa, Dębinki, Dobra Wola, Głodowo Wielkie, Jackowo Dworskie, Jackowo Włościańskie, Jaskółowo, Kątne, Kędzierzawice, Konary, Kosewo, Krogule, Krzyczki Szumne, Krzyczki-Pieniążki, Krzyczki-Żabiczki, Lelewo, Lorcin, Lubomin, Lubominek, Malczyn, Mazewo Dworskie A, Mazewo Dworskie B, Mazewo Włościańskie, Miękoszyn, Miękoszynek, Młodzianowo, Mogowo, Mokrzyce Dworskie, Mokrzyce Włościańskie, Morgi, Nowa Wieś, Nowa Wrona, Nowe Pieścirogi, Nowiny, Nuna, Paulinowo, Pianowo-Bargły, Pianowo-Daczki, Pniewo, Pniewska Górka, Popowo Borowe, Popowo-Północ, Popowo-Południe, Psucin, Ruszkowo, Siennica, Słustowo, Stare Pieścirogi, Studzianki, Toruń Dworski, Toruń Włościański, Wągrodno, Wiktorowo, Winniki, Żabiczyn and Zaborze.

== Neighbouring gminas ==
Gmina Nasielsk is bordered by the gminas of Joniec, Nowe Miasto, Pomiechówek, Serock, Świercze, Winnica and Zakroczym.
