= Nowy Dwór County, Masovian Voivodeship =

Nowy Dwór County Powiat nowodworski
- County
- Flag Coat of arms

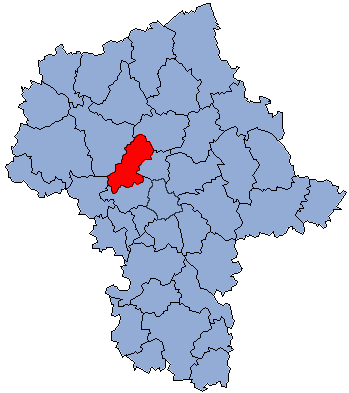
- Location within the voivodeship

- Division into gminas
- Coordinates (Nowy Dwór): 52°26′N 20°41′E
- Country: Poland
- Voivodeship: Masovian
- Seat: Nowy Dwór Mazowiecki
- Gminas: Total 6 (incl. 1 urban): Nowy Dwór Mazowiecki; Gmina Czosnów; Gmina Leoncin; Gmina Nasielsk; Gmina Pomiechówek; Gmina Zakroczym

Area
  - Total: 691.65 km^{2} (267.05 sq mi)

Population (2019)
  - Total: 79,256
  - Density: 114.59/km^{2} (296.79/sq mi)
  - Urban: 39,547
  - Rural: 39,709
- Car plates: WND
- Website: www.regioset.pl/p.nowodworski.maz

Nowy Dwór County (Polish: powiat nowodworski) is a unit of territorial administration and local government (powiat) in Masovian Voivodeship, east-central Poland. It came into being on January 1, 1999, as a result of the Polish local government reforms passed in 1998. Its administrative seat and largest town is Nowy Dwór Mazowiecki, which lies 33 kilometres (21 mi) north-west of Warsaw. The county also contains the towns of Nasielsk, lying 21 km (13 mi) north-east of Nowy Dwór Mazowiecki, and Zakroczym, 5 km (3 mi) west of Nowy Dwór Mazowiecki. Warsaw-Modlin Airport is located within the county. The county covers an area of 691.65 square kilometres (267.0 sq mi). As of 2019, its total population is 79,256, out of which the population of Nowy Dwór Mazowiecki is 28,649, that of Nasielsk is 7,702, that of Zakroczym is 3,196, and the rural population is 39,709.

== Neighbouring counties ==
Nowy Dwór County is bordered by Pułtusk County to the north-east, Legionowo County to the east, Warsaw West County to the south, Sochaczew County to the south-west and Płońsk County to the north-west.

== Administrative divisions ==
The county is subdivided into six gminas (one urban, two urban-rural and three rural). These are listed in the following table, in descending order of population.

| Gmina | Type | Area (km^{2}) | Population (2019) | Seat |
|---|---|---|---|---|
| Nowy Dwór Mazowiecki | urban | 28.3 | 28,649 | |
| Gmina Nasielsk | urban-rural | 202.5 | 19,950 | Nasielsk |
| Gmina Czosnów | rural | 128.3 | 9,951 | Czosnów |
| Gmina Pomiechówek | rural | 102.3 | 9,053 | Brody-Parcele |
| Gmina Zakroczym | urban-rural | 71.4 | 6,055 | Zakroczym |
| Gmina Leoncin | rural | 158.8 | 5,598 | Leoncin |
