= 2026–27 UCI Cyclo-cross season =

Bicycle racing competition

Details
- Dates: May 2026 – February 2027
- Location: World (North America, Europe, Asia, Australia and New Zealand)

The calendar for the 2026–2027 men's and women's cyclo-cross season includes cyclo-cross races starting in May 2026, and ending in February 2027. The individual events are classified into five categories. The highest category includes the world cup events (CDM), which gives rise to a ranking. Behind them, we find the C1 and C2 category races, which award points are for the world ranking, then the races reserved for those under 23, also called hopes (category CU) and finally the races for juniors (category CJ) . There are also national championships (NC) which are organized in about thirty countries.

== Men's Elite ==
=== Events ===
==== September ====
Date	Course	Class	Winner	Team	References
13 September 2026	(Canada) Canmore CX C2, Canmore	C2	Rhett Bates (CAN)	Caledon Hills Cycling Armada	
26 September 2026	(Luxembourg) Cyclocross UC Dippach, Dippach	C2	Wout Janssen (BEL)	Cyclis - Roofs for Energy - Van Den Plas	
26 September 2026	(France) Breizh CX Tour - Quimper Kerustum, Quimper	C2	Matéo Jot (FRA)	Dammary-les-Lys	
27 September 2026	(France) Breizh CX Tour - Quimper Kerustum, Quimper	C2	Quentin Navarro (FRA)	Team Atria Clermont	
27 September 2026	(Switzerland) Radcross Illnau, Illnau-Effretikon	C2	Finn Treudler (SUI)	Heizomat - Cube	

==== October ====
Date	Course	Class	Winner	Team	References
10 October 2026	(Czech Republic) Grand Prix Pilsen, Plzeň	C1	Kryštof Bažant (CZE)	Cyklostar Racing Team	
15 October 2026	(Belgium) Kermiscross, Ardooie	C2	Gerben Kuypers (BEL)	Pauwels Sauzen–Altez Industriebouw Cycling Team	
17 October 2026	(Portugal) Ciclocrosse de Melgaço, Melgaço	C2	Cancelled		
17 October 2026	(United States) Kings CX - Day 1, Deerfield Township	C1	Andrew Strohmeyer (USA)	Competitive Edge Racing	
18 October 2026	(United States) Kings CX - Day 2, Deerfield Township	C2	Dylan Haynes (USA)	CXD Trek Bikes	
24 October 2026	(Denmark) Copenhagen Cyclo Cross Clash - Day 1, Copenhagen	C2	Clément Horny (BEL)		
24 October 2026	(Italy) Gran Premio Francesconi Salvirola - Day 1, Salvirola	C2	Cancelled		
24 October 2026	(United States) Major Taylor Cross Cup - Day 1, Indianapolis	C2	Miles Mattern (USA)	CXD Trek Bikes	
25 October 2026	(Denmark) Copenhagen Cyclo Cross Clash - Day 2, Copenhagen	C2	Clément Horny (BEL)		
25 October 2026	(Italy) Gran Premio Francesconi Salvirola - Day 2, Salvirola	C2	Cancelled		
25 October 2026	(United States) Major Taylor Cross Cup - Day 2, Indianapolis	C2	Miles Mattern (USA)	CXD Trek Bikes	
30 October 2026	(Italy) 47° Gran Premio Mamma e Papà Guerciotti, Brembate	C2	Gioele Bertolini (ITA)	Ale CX Team	
31 October 2026	(United States) Cycle-Smart Northampton Cyclocross Day 1, Northampton	C2	Eric Brunner (USA)	Competitive Edge Racing	

==== November ====
Date	Course	Class	Winner	Team	References
1 November 2026	(Canada) Hardwood Cross, Oro-Medonte	C2	Tyler Clark (CAN)		
1 November 2026	(United States) Cycle-Smart Northampton Cyclocross Day 2, Northampton	C2	Eric Brunner (USA)	Competitive Edge Racing	
8 November 2026	(United States) DCCX, Washington	C2	Eric Brunner (USA)	Competitive Edge Racing	
14 November 2026	(United States) Boulder Cup, Boulder	C1			
15 November 2026	(Canada) Cyclo-Cross de Lévis, Lévis	C2			
15 November 2026	(United States) Boulder Cup, Boulder	C2			
21 November 2026	(United States) North Carolina Grand Prix - Day 1, Hendersonville	C2			
22 November 2026	(United States) North Carolina Grand Prix - Day 2, Hendersonville	C2			

== 2026–27 Cyclo-cross Superprestige ==
Date	Course	Class	Winner	Team	References
25 October 2026	(Belgium) 2026–27 Superprestige Overijse – Druivencross, Overijse	C1	Michael Vanthourenhout (BEL)	Pauwels Sauzen–Altez Industriebouw Cycling Team	
5 November 2026	(Belgium) 2026–27 Superprestige Middelkerke – Noordzeecross, Middelkerke	C1	Joran Wyseure (BEL)	Crelan - Corendon	
11 November 2026	(Belgium) 2026–27 Superprestige Niel – Jaarmarktcross, Niel	C1	Cameron Mason (GBR)	777	
14 November 2026	(Belgium) 2026–27 Superprestige Merksplas – Aardbeiencross, Merksplas	C1	Niels Vandeputte (BEL)	Alpecin–Premier Tech	

== 2026–27 Cyclo-cross Trophy ==
Date	Course	Class	Winner	Team	References
1 November 2026	(Belgium) X2O Trofee – Koppenbergcross, Oudenaarde	C1	Thibau Nys (BEL)	Baloise Verzekeringen–Het Poetsbureau Lions	

== 2026-2027 HG Cross ==
Date	Course	Class	Winner	Team	References
11 October 2026	(Belgium) 2026–27 HG Cross – Mosselcross, Dendermonde	C1	Michael Vanthourenhout (BEL)	Pauwels Sauzen–Altez Industriebouw Cycling Team	
17 October 2026	(Belgium) 2026–27 HG Cross – Berencross, Meulebeke	C2	Michael Vanthourenhout (BEL)	Pauwels Sauzen–Altez Industriebouw Cycling Team	
24 October 2026	(Netherlands) 2026–27 HG Cross – Internationale Cyclocross Heerderstrand, Heerde	C2	Joran Wyseure (BEL)	Crelan - Corendon	

== Women's Elite ==
=== Events ===
==== September ====
Date	Course	Class	Winner	Team	References
13 September 2026	(Canada) Canmore CX C2, Canmore	C2	Sidney McGill (CAN)	Materiaal - Lastig	
26 September 2026	(Luxembourg) Cyclocross UC Dippach, Dippach	C2	Marie Schreiber (LUX)	Team SD Worx–Protime	
26 September 2026	(France) Breizh CX Tour - Quimper Kerustum, Quimper	C2	Alexandra Valade (FRA)	VCESQY Team Voussert	
27 September 2026	(France) Breizh CX Tour - Quimper Kerustum, Quimper	C2	Alexandra Valade (FRA)	VCESQY Team Voussert	
27 September 2026	(Switzerland) Radcross Illnau, Illnau-Effretikon	C2	Lucia Bramati (ITA)	FAS Airport Services – Guerciotti	

==== October ====
Date	Course	Class	Winner	Team	References
10 October 2026	(Czech Republic) Grand Prix Pilsen, Plzeň	C1	Kateřina Hladíková (CZE)	Brilon Racing Team MB	
15 October 2026	(Belgium) Kermiscross, Ardooie	C2	Lucinda Brand (NED)	Baloise Verzekeringen–Het Poetsbureau Lions	
17 October 2026	(Portugal) Ciclocrosse de Melgaço, Melgaço	C2	Cancelled		
17 October 2026	(United States) Kings CX - Day 1, Deerfield Township	C1	Manon Bakker (NED)		
18 October 2026	(United States) Kings CX - Day 2, Deerfield Township	C2	Sidney McGill (CAN)	Materiaal - Lastig	
24 October 2026	(Denmark) Copenhagen Cyclo Cross Clash - Day 1, Copenhagen	C2	Mille Foldager Nielsen (DEN)		
24 October 2026	(Italy) Gran Premio Francesconi Salvirola - Day 1, Salvirola	C2	Cancelled		
24 October 2026	(United States) Major Taylor Cross Cup - Day 1, Indianapolis	C2	Alyssa Sarkisov (USA)	CXD Trek Bikes	
25 October 2026	(Denmark) Copenhagen Cyclo Cross Clash - Day 2, Copenhagen	C2	Tomke Windelband (GER)		
25 October 2026	(Italy) Gran Premio Francesconi Salvirola - Day 2, Salvirola	C2	Cancelled		
25 October 2026	(United States) Major Taylor Cross Cup - Day 2, Indianapolis	C2	Alyssa Sarkisov (USA)	CXD Trek Bikes	
30 October 2026	(Italy) 47° Gran Premio Mamma e Papà Guerciotti, Brembate	C2	Lucia Bramati (ITA)	FAS Airport Services - Guerciotti	
31 October 2026	(United States) Cycle-Smart Northampton Cyclocross Day 1, Northampton	C2	Lizzy Gunsalus (USA)		

==== November ====
Date	Course	Class	Winner	Team	References
1 November 2026	(Canada) Hardwood Cross, Oro-Medonte	C2	Sidney McGill (CAN)		
1 November 2026	(United States) Cycle-Smart Northampton Cyclocross Day 2, Northampton	C2	Lizzy Gunsalus (USA)		
8 November 2026	(United States) DCCX, Washington	C2	Lidia Cusack (USA)	CXD Trek Bikes	
14 November 2026	(United States) Boulder Cup, Boulder	C1			
15 November 2026	(Canada) Cyclo-Cross de Lévis, Lévis	C2			
15 November 2026	(United States) Boulder Cup, Boulder	C2			
21 November 2026	(United States) North Carolina Grand Prix - Day 1, Hendersonville	C2			
22 November 2026	(United States) North Carolina Grand Prix - Day 2, Hendersonville	C2			

== 2026–27 Cyclo-cross Superprestige ==
Date	Course	Class	Winner	Team	References
25 October 2026	(Belgium) 2026–27 Superprestige Overijse – Druivencross, Overijse	C1	Lucinda Brand (NED)	Baloise Verzekeringen–Het Poetsbureau Lions	
5 November 2026	(Belgium) 2026–27 Superprestige Middelkerke – Noordzeecross, Middelkerke	C1	Aniek van Alphen (NED)	777	
11 November 2026	(Belgium) 2026–27 Superprestige Niel – Jaarmarktcross, Niel	C1	Manon Bakker (NED)		
14 November 2026	(Belgium) 2026–27 Superprestige Merksplas – Aardbeiencross, Merksplas	C1	Lucinda Brand (NED)	Baloise Verzekeringen–Het Poetsbureau Lions	

== 2026–27 Cyclo-cross Trophy ==
Date	Course	Class	Winner	Team	References
1 November 2026	(Belgium) X2O Trofee – Koppenbergcross, Oudenaarde	C1	Lucinda Brand (NED)	Baloise Verzekeringen–Het Poetsbureau Lions	

== 2026-2027 Exact Cross ==
Date	Course	Class	Winner	Team	References
11 October 2026	(Belgium) 2026–27 HG Cross – Mosselcross, Dendermonde	C1	Lucinda Brand (NED)	Baloise Verzekeringen–Het Poetsbureau Lions	
17 October 2026	(Belgium) 2026–27 HG Cross – Berencross, Meulebeke	C2	Marie Schreiber (LUX)	Team SD Worx–Protime	
24 October 2026	(Netherlands) 2026–27 HG Cross – Internationale Cyclocross Heerderstrand, Heerde	C2	Ceylin del Carmen Alvarado (NED)	Fenix–Premier Tech	

== National Cups Men's Elite ==
=== 2026–27 GUNSHA -Cycling Austria CX Cup ===
Date	Course	Class	Winner	Team	References
8 October 2026	(Austria) Quer durchs Stadion – Pernitz, Pernitz	NE	Michael Holland (AUT)	Naturfreunde Wilhelmsburg-Göblasbruck	
11 October 2026	(Austria) 11.King & Queen of Seeschlacht powered by Bikestore.cc, Langenzersdorf	NE	Michael Holland (AUT)	Naturfreunde Wilhelmsburg-Göblasbruck	
18 October 2026	(Austria) St. Pöltner Querfeldein im Kaiserwald, St. Pölten	NE	Michael Holland (AUT)	Naturfreunde Wilhelmsburg-Göblasbruck	
24 October 2026	(Austria) Wienenergie Cyclocross Landegg, Pottendorf	NE	Cancelled		
25 October 2026	(Austria) Wienenergie Cyclocross Landegg, Pottendorf	NE	Cancelled		
31 October 2026	(Austria) Mud Master Cyclocross Mittelkärnten, St. Veit an der Glan	NE	Fabian Rehberger (AUT)	ARBÖ ON-Fahrrad	
8 November 2026	(Austria) DWH – dachwelten cross pb Boa Wels, Wels	NE	Philipp Heigl (AUT)	SU Bikestore.cc Team	
14 November 2026	(Austria) GP Ternitz, Ternitz	NE			
15 November 2026	(Austria) GP Ternitz - Preise des ARBÖ, Ternitz	NE			
21 November 2026	(Austria) 11. Bad Ischler CX, Bad Ischl	NE			
22 November 2026	(Austria) Int. Querfeldein GP Gunskirchen um das Sportzentrum, Gunskirchen	C2			
28 November 2026	(Austria) 2. Erlauftal-Cross, Purgstall an der Erlauf	NE			
29 November 2026	(Austria) Park-Cross, Böheimkirchen	NE			
13 December 2026	(Austria) CX-Mas Cross Volume 4, Markgrafneusiedl	NE			
6 January 2027	(Austria) 3KöniXcrosS, St. Pölten	NE			
9 January 2027	(Austria) Cyclocross Cup-Finale, Salzburg	NE			

=== 2026 AusCycling National Cyclo-Cross Series ===
Date	Course	Class	Winner	Team	References
23 May 2026	(Australia) 2026 AusCycling CX National Series Round 1, Ascot	NE	Hayden Vimpani (AUS)		
24 May 2026	(Australia) 2026 AusCycling CX National Series Round 2, Ascot	NE	Hayden Vimpani (AUS)		
27 June 2026	(Australia) 2026 AusCycling CX National Series Round 3, Canberra	NE	Hayden Vimpani (AUS)		
28 June 2026	(Australia) 2026 AusCycling CX National Series Round 4, Canberra	NE	Nicholas Smith (AUS)		
11 July 2026	(Australia) 2026 AusCycling CX National Series Round 5, Walloon	NE	Garry Millburn (AUS)		
12 July 2026	(Australia) 2026 AusCycling CX National Series Round 6, Walloon	NE	Garry Millburn (AUS)		
16 August 2026	(Australia) 2026 AusCycling CX National Series Round 7, Ballarat	NE	Nicholas Smith (AUS)		

=== 2026–27 Belgian Concap CX Cup ===
Date	Course	Class	Winner	Team	References
6 September 2026	(Belgium) 2026–27 Belgian Concap CX Cup #1, Kessel	NE	Ward Huybs (BEL)		
13 September 2026	(Belgium) 2026–27 Belgian Concap CX Cup #2, Heist-op-den-Berg	NE	Ward Huybs (BEL)		
19 September 2026	(Belgium) 2026–27 Belgian Concap CX Cup #3, Steenhuffel	NE	Jarno Bellens (BEL)	Baloise Verzekeringen–Het Poetsbureau Lions	
27 September 2026	(Belgium) 2026–27 Belgian Concap CX Cup #4, Gierle	NE	Rune Ceusters (BEL)	VP Consulting Cycling Team	
11 October 2026	(Belgium) 2026–27 Belgian Concap CX Cup #5, Nossegem	NE	Arthur Soontjens (BEL)	Cyclis - Roofs for Energy - Van den Plas Cycling Team	
17 October 2026	(Belgium) 2026–27 Belgian Concap CX Cup #6, Eversel	NE	Ingmar Uytdewilligen (BEL)	VP Consulting Cycling Team	
25 October 2026	(Belgium) 2026–27 Belgian Concap CX Cup #7, Herenthout	NE	Arthur Soontjens (BEL)	Cyclis - Roofs for Energy - Van den Plas Cycling Team	
31 October 2026	(Belgium) 2026–27 Belgian Concap CX Cup #8, Fonteinencross, Vilvoorde	NE	Arthur Soontjens (BEL)	Cyclis - Roofs for Energy - Van den Plas Cycling Team	
21 November 2026	(Belgium) 2026–27 Belgian Concap CX Cup #9, Boortmeerbeek	NE			
28 November 2026	(Belgium) 2026–27 Belgian Concap CX Cup #10, Meulebeke	NE			
26 December 2026	(Belgium) 2026–27 Belgian Concap CX Cup #11, Beernem	NE			
30 December 2026	(Belgium) 2026–27 Belgian Concap CX Cup #12, Hamme	NE			
17 January 2027	(Belgium) 2026–27 Belgian Concap CX Cup #13, Bekkevoort	NE			
24 January 2027	(Belgium) 2026–27 Belgian Concap CX Cup #14, Meer	NE			
31 January 2027	(Belgium) 2026–27 Belgian Concap CX Cup #15, Izegem	NE			

=== Campeonato Metropolitano de Ciclocross 2026 ===
Date	Course	Class	Winner	Team	References
7 June 2026	2026 Chile CX Cup 1, Curacaví	NE	Joaquin Muñoz (CHI)	Club Escuela MTB del Maipo	
21 June 2026	2026 Chile CX Cup 2, Peñalolén	NE	Joaquin Muñoz (CHI)	Club Escuela MTB del Maipo	
12 July 2026	2026 Chile CX Cup 3, Maipú	NE	Patricio Campbell (CHI)	Bortec Cycling	
26 July 2026	2026 Chile CX Cup 4, San Bernardo	NE	Juan Pablo Agloni (CHI)	Club Ciclismo Zona 7	
9 August 2026	2026 Chile CX Cup 5, Curacaví	NE	Patricio Campbell (CHI)	Bortec Cycling	

=== 2026 Czech Cup (Janev Cup) ===
Date	Course	Class	Winner	Team	References
3 October 2026	(Czech Republic) 2026 Janev Cup #1, Chýnov	C1	Witse Meeussen (BEL)	Crelan - Corendon	
17 October 2026	(Czech Republic) 2026 Janev Cup #2, Holé Vrchy	C2	Kryštof Bažant (CZE)		
24 October 2026	(Czech Republic) 2026 Janev Cup #3, Rýmařov	C1	Marek Konwa (POL)	TJ Auto Škoda MB	
31 October 2026	(Czech Republic) 2026 Janev Cup #4, Hlinsko	C2	Kryštof Bažant (CZE)		
14 November 2026	(Czech Republic) 2026 Janev Cup #5, Jičín	C2	Marek Konwa (POL)	TJ Auto Škoda MB	
17 November 2026	(Czech Republic) 2026 Janev Cup #6, Prachatice	NE			
5 December 2026	(Czech Republic) 2026 Janev Cup #7, Kolín	C2			
12 December 2026	(Czech Republic) 2026 Janev Cup #8, Veselí nad Lužnicí	C1			

=== 2026 Danish Cross-Cup ===
Date	Course	Class	Winner	Team	References
24 October 2026	(Denmark) Copenhagen Cyclo Cross Clash - Day 2, Copenhagen	C2	Part of Copenhagen Cyclo Cross Clash		
1 November 2026	(Denmark) Alflow Cross, Kalundborg	NE	Philip Hyldtoft (DEN)	Tønder Amatør Cykle Ring	
7 November 2026	(Denmark) Fredericia CC - Cross Cup 3, Fredericia	NE	Jonas Posselt Gamborg (DEN)	Holstebro Cycleclub af 1960	
15 November 2026	(Denmark) Cross-Cup IV - Roskilde, Roskilde	NE	Jonas Posselt Gamborg (DEN)	Holstebro Cycleclub af 1960	
5 December 2026	(Denmark) Cross-Cup V - Skive Cykle Klub, Skive	NE			
12 December 2026	(Denmark) Cross-Cup VI - Holbæk Sportsby, Holbæk	NE			

=== 2026 Estonian Cup (CX Karikasari) ===
Date	Course	Class	Winner	Team	References
27 September 2026	(Estonia) Haanja CX, Haanja	NE	Riko Tammepuu (EST)		
3 October 2026	(Estonia) Rapla CX, Rapla	NE	Kirill Tarassov (EST)		
10 October 2026	(Estonia) Elva CX, Elva	NE	Markus Mäeuibo (EST)		
17 October 2026	(Estonia) CX Tallinn, Tallinn	NE	Kirill Tarassov (EST)		
24 October 2026	(Estonia) BikeFanatics Rakke CX '26, Rakke	NE	Matthias Mõttus (EST)		

=== 2026 Finnish Cup ===
Date	Course	Class	Winner	Team	References
13 September 2026	(Finland) Valkeala Cyclocross, Kouvola	NE	Daniel Härginen (FIN)	KorsKa	
20 September 2026	(Finland) Rajamäki CX, Rajamäki	NE	Elias Eskelinen (FIN)	RaKe	
27 September 2026	(Finland) CX Olari, Espoo	NE	Elias Eskelinen (FIN)	RaKe	
4 October 2026	(Finland) Lieto CX Cup 4., Lieto	NE	Petja Teppo (FIN)	JurVo	
25 October 2026	(Finland) Tuusula Cyclocross, Tuusula	NE	Antti-Jussi Juntunen (FIN)	Korson Kaiku	
1 November 2026	(Finland) Kivikko Prestige, Helsinki	NE	Petja Teppo (FIN)	UN Cycling Team	

=== 2026 Coupe de France de cyclo-cross ===
Date	Course	Class	Winner	Team	References
24 October 2026	Coupe de France de cyclo-cross #1, Nommay	C2	Aubin Sparfel (FRA)	Decathlon CMA CGM	
25 October 2026	Coupe de France de cyclo-cross #2, Nommay	C2	Aubin Sparfel (FRA)	Decathlon CMA CGM	
21 November 2026	Coupe de France de cyclo-cross #3, Issoire	C2			
22 November 2026	Coupe de France de cyclo-cross #4, Issoire	C2			
12 December 2026	Coupe de France de cyclo-cross #5, Saint-Prouant	C2			
13 December 2026	Coupe de France de cyclo-cross #6, Saint-Prouant	C2			

=== 2026–27 German Bundesliga Cyclocross ===
Date	Course	Class	Winner	Team	References
19 September 2026	(Germany) Int. Cyclo-Cross Bad Salzdetfurth #1, Bad Salzdetfurth	C2	Yordi Corsus (BEL)	Pauwels Sauzen–Altez Industriebouw Cycling Team	
20 September 2026	(Germany) Int. Cyclo-Cross Bad Salzdetfurth #2, Bad Salzdetfurth	C2	Yordi Corsus (BEL)	Pauwels Sauzen–Altez Industriebouw Cycling Team	
3 October 2026	(Germany) Bauhaus Perlcross, Perl	C2	Michael Vanthourenhout (BEL)	Pauwels Sauzen–Altez Industriebouw Cycling Team	
4 October 2026	(Germany) Bauhaus Perlcross, Perl	NE	Jonas Köpsel (GER)	Radsport Nagel CX Team	
11 October 2026	(Germany) Rund um den Lohner Aussichtsturm, Lohne	NE	Jonas Köpsel (GER)	Radsport Nagel CX Team	
24 October 2026	(Germany) 6.1 Munich Super Cross, München	NE	Florian Hamm (GER)		
25 October 2026	(Germany) 6.2 Int. C2 Munich Super Cross, München	C2	Luca Harter (GER)		
7 November 2026	(Germany) Vaihinger Radcross 2026, Vaihingen an der Enz	NE	Michael Gaßner (GER)	RSV Moosburg	
8 November 2026	(Germany) Magstadter Radcross, Magstadt	NE	Michael Gaßner (GER)	RSV Moosburg	
14 November 2026	(Germany) Cyclo-Cross Bundesliga 2026/2027 Stahnsdorf #1, Stahnsdorf	NE			
15 November 2026	(Germany) Cyclo-Cross Bundesliga 2026/2027 Stahnsdorf #2, Stahnsdorf	NE			
3 January 2027	(Germany) Vechtaer Querfeldeinrennen am Reiterwaldstadion, Vechta	NE			

=== 2026–27 British Cyclo-cross National Trophy ===
Date	Course	Class	Winner	Team	References
17–18 October 2026	(United Kingdom) Cyclo-cross National Trophy #1, Derby	~~C2~~ NE	Thomas Mein (GBR)	Hope Factory Racing	
7–8 November 2026	(United Kingdom) Cyclo-cross National Trophy #2, Pontypool	NE	James Swadling (GBR)	Pedal Power Loughborough	
28–29 November 2026	(United Kingdom) Cyclo-cross National Trophy #3, Gravesend	NE			
19–20 December 2026	(United Kingdom) Cyclo-cross National Trophy #4, Shrewsbury	NE			
23 January 2027	(United Kingdom) Cyclo-cross National Trophy #5, North Ayrshire	NE			
24 January 2027	(United Kingdom) Cyclo-cross National Trophy #6, North Ayrshire	NE			

=== 2026–27 Hungarian Cup (Cyclo-cross Magyar Kupa) ===
Date	Course	Class	Winner	Team	References
11 October 2026	(Hungary) Hungarian Cup #1 and Cyclo-Cross Challenge #1, Budapest	NE	Boldizsár Zsembery (HUN)	Campana Imballaggi–Morbiato–Trentino	
24 October 2026	(Hungary) Hungarian Cup #2, Siklós	NE	Gergő Grósz (HUN)	ARBÖ Kärnten Sport Feld al See	
31 October 2026	(Hungary) Hungarian Cup #3 and Cyclo-Cross Challenge #2, Kiskunlacháza	NE	Gergő Grósz (HUN)	ARBÖ Kärnten Sport Feld al See	
21 November 2026	(Hungary) Hungarian Cup #4, Debrecen	NE			
5 December 2026	(Hungary) Hungarian Cup #5 and Cyclo-Cross Challenge #3, Etyek	NE			
13 December 2026	(Hungary) Hungarian Cup #6, Vácrátót	NE			

=== 2026–27 Italian Giro delle Regioni Ciclocross ===
Date	Course	Class	Winner	Team	References
27 September 2026	(Italy) 8^ Trofeo CorridoMnia - 1# Giro delle Regioni Ciclocross, Corridonia	NE	Pietro Cao (ITA)	ASD GS Sorgente Pradipozzo	
4 October 2026	(Italy) 4° GP Città di Tarvisio - 2# Giro delle Regioni Ciclocross, Tarvisio	C2	Filippo Grigolini (ITA)	Decathlon CMA CGM	
11 October 2026	(Italy) CX Rivellino 2026 - 3# Giro delle Regioni Ciclocross, Osoppo	C2	Stefano Viezzi (ITA)	Alpecin–Premier Tech	
18 October 2026	(Italy) Zoncross Classic - 4# Giro delle Regioni Ciclocross, Sutrio	C2	Gioele Bertolini (ITA)	Ale CX Team	
25 October 2026	(Italy) 5# Giro delle Regioni Ciclocross, Capalbio	NE	Tommaso Tabotta (ITA)	B-Team Cycling Project	
20 December 2026	(Italy) GP Valfontanabuona – 6# Giro delle Regioni Ciclocross, San Colombano Certénoli	C2			

=== 2026 Latvian Cup Cyclocross ===
Date	Course	Class	Winner	Team	References
26 September 2026	(Latvia) Latvian Cup #1, Mārupe	NE	Helvijs Kancers (LVA)	MSĢ/RRS	
4 October 2026	(Latvia) Latvian Cup #2, Salaspils	NE	Helvijs Kancers (LVA)	MSĢ/RRS	
25 October 2026	(Latvia) Latvian Cup #3, Smiltene	NE	Helvijs Kancers (LVA)	MSĢ/RRS	
31 October 2026	(Latvia) Latvian Cup #4, Ozolnieki	NE	Bruno Šterns (LVA)	Ogre/TNR	

=== 2026 Lithuania Cup Cyclocross ===
Date	Course	Class	Winner	Team	References
27 September 2026	Lithuania Cup #1, Kėdainiai	NE	Mindaugas Šeduikis (LTU)	Šiandien lengvai x Avilė	
4 October 2026	Lithuania Cup #2, Vilnius	NE	Mindaugas Šeduikis (LTU)	Šiandien lengvai x Avilė	
17 October 2026	Lithuania Cup #3 – VeloCX International CX Race - Day 1, Vilnius	C2	Timothé Gabriel (FRA)	Team CX TPM	
18 October 2026	Lithuania Cup #4 – VeloCX International CX Race - Day 2, Vilnius	C2	Timothé Gabriel (FRA)	Team CX TPM	

=== 2026 Škoda Cross Cup ===
Date	Course	Class	Winner	Team	References
11 October 2026	(Luxembourg) Škoda Cross Cup #1 – Festival du cyclo-cross à Kayl 2026, Kayl	NE	Lennox Papi (LUX)	CT Toproad Roeserbann	
17 October 2026	(Luxembourg) Škoda Cross Cup #2 – Urban Nightcross – Memorial Claude Michely, Kayl	NE	Lennox Papi (LUX)	CT Toproad Roeserbann	
18 October 2026	(Luxembourg) Škoda Cross Cup #3 – Grand Prix Gemeng Munnerëf, Mondorf-les-Bains	NE	Lennox Papi (LUX)	CT Toproad Roeserbann	
25 October 2026	(Luxembourg) Škoda Cross Cup #4 – ACC Contern, Contern	C2	Arne Baers (BEL)	Baloise Verzekeringen–Het Poetsbureau Lions	
22 November 2026	(Luxembourg) Škoda Cross Cup #5 – SaF Zéisseng, Cessange	NE			
29 November 2026	(Luxembourg) Škoda Cross Cup #6 – LP 07 Schifflange, Schifflange	NE			
6 December 2026	(Luxembourg) Škoda Cross Cup #7 – VV Tooltime, Préizerdaul	NE			
13 December 2026	(Luxembourg) Škoda Cross Cup #8 – UCN Ettelbruck, Ettelbruck	NE			
26 December 2026	(Luxembourg) Škoda Cross Cup #9 – CCI Differdange, Differdange	NE			
1 January 2027	(Luxembourg) Škoda Cross Cup #10 – Grand Prix du Nouvel an Pétange, Pétange	C2			
3 January 2027	(Luxembourg) Škoda Cross Cup #11 – LG Alzingen, Alzingen	NE			
16 January 2027	(Luxembourg) Škoda Cross Cup #12 – Grand-Prix de l'Armée Diekirch, Diekirch	C2			
17 January 2027	(Luxembourg) Škoda Cross Cup #13 – VC Diekirch, Diekirch	NE			

=== 2026 Netherlands National Cup ===
Date	Course	Class	Winner	Team	References
27 September 2026	(Netherlands) Kleeberg Cross weekend Day 2, Mechelen	C2	Wout Janssen (BEL)		
3–4 October 2026	(Netherlands) NL Cup: Nationale & Jeugdveldrit Norg, Norg	NE	Danny Turkstra (NED)	WSV de Peddelaars	
10 October 2026	(Netherlands) NL Cup: 12e Nationale Veldrit van Rhenen, Rhenen	NE	Floris Haverdings (NED)	JEGG – SKIL – DJR	
18 October 2026	(Netherlands) Rolande GP Oisterwijk, Oisterwijk	NE	Swen Vonk (NED)	JEGG – SKIL – DJR	
20 October 2026	(Netherlands) 26e Nacht van Woerden, Woerden	C2	Joris Nieuwenhuis (NED)	Heizomat - Cube	
24 October 2026	(Netherlands) Internationale Cyclocross Heerderstrand, Heerde	C2	Part of HG Cross Series		
1 November 2026	(Netherlands) Nationale Veldrit Almelo 15+, Almelo	NE	Danny Turkstra (NED)	WSV de Peddelaars	
15 November 2026	(Netherlands) Vam-Berg Cross Wijster, Wijster	C2			
21 November 2026	(Netherlands) NL Cup: Janet Memorial Veldrit van Hilversum, Hilversum	NE			
29 November 2026	(Netherlands) NL Cup: De bultcross Leiden - Day 2, Leiden	NE			

=== 2026 New Zealand Southern Cross Series ===
Date	Course	Class	Winner	Team	References
3 May 2026	(New Zealand) 2026 Southern Cross Series Round 1, Christchurch	NE	Jacob Turner (NZL)		
24 May 2026	(New Zealand) 2026 Southern Cross Series Round 2, Christchurch	NE	Jacob Turner (NZL)		
14 June 2026	(New Zealand) 2026 Southern Cross Series Round 3, Christchurch	NE	Jacob Turner (NZL)		
28 June 2026	(New Zealand) 2026 Southern Cross Series Round 4, Christchurch	NE	Jacob Turner (NZL)		
26 July 2026	(New Zealand) 2026 Southern Cross Series Round 5, Christchurch	NE	Jacob Turner (NZL)		
16 August 2026	(New Zealand) 2026 Southern Cross Series Round 6, Christchurch	NE	Jacob Turner (NZL)		

=== 2026 Polish Cup ===
Date	Course	Class	Winner	Team	—	References
10 October 2026	(Poland) Puchar Polski #1, Kielce	NE	Krzysztof Domin (POL)	Domin Sport Team		
18 October 2026	(Poland) Puchar Polski #2, Kluczbork	NE	Marek Konwa (POL)	TJ Auto Škoda MB		
24 October 2026	(Poland) B Class, Słubice	NE	Kacper Mizuro (POL)		Not part of Polish Cup	
25 October 2026	(Poland) Puchar Polski #3, Słubice	NE	Filip Helta (POL)	Mazowsze Serce Polski		
7 November 2026	(Poland) Puchar Polski #4, Piaseczno	NE	Marek Konwa (POL)	TJ Auto Škoda MB		
8 November 2026	(Poland) Puchar Polski #5, Szczekociny	NE	Marek Konwa (POL)	TJ Auto Škoda MB		
11 November 2026	(Poland) Puchar Polski #6, Koziegłowy	NE	Marek Konwa (POL)	TJ Auto Škoda MB		
21 November 2026	(Poland) Puchar Polski #7, Koźminek	NE				
28 November 2026	(Poland) B Class, Turawa	NE				
29 November 2026	(Poland) Puchar Polski #8, Środa Wielkopolska	NE				
13 December 2026	(Poland) Puchar Polski #9, Środa Wielkopolska	NE				
19 December 2026	(Poland) B Class, Załuski	NE				
20 December 2026	(Poland) Puchar Polski #10, Załuski	NE				

=== 2026 Portugal Cup (Taça de Portugal Ciclocrosse) ===
Date	Course	Class	Winner	Team	References
17 October 2026	1ª Taça de Portugal Ciclocrosse, Marco de Canaveses	NE	Rafael Sousa (POR)	Feira dos Sofás-Boavista	
18 October 2026	2ª Taça de Portugal Ciclocrosse, Santo Tirso	C2	Raúl Mira (ESP)	Nesta - MMR CX Team	
24 October 2026	3ª Taça de Portugal Ciclocrosse, Vouzela	C2	Rafael Sousa (POR)	Feira dos Sofás-Boavista	
25 October 2026	4ª Taça de Portugal Ciclocrosse, Vila Real	C2	Rafael Sousa (POR)	Feira dos Sofás-Boavista	
5 December 2026	5ª Taça de Portugal Ciclocrosse, Vale de Cambra	NE			
6 December 2026	6ª Taça de Portugal Ciclocrosse, TBD	NE			

=== 2026 Romanian Cup (Cupa României) ===
Date	Course	Class	Winner	Team	References
24–25 October 2026	(Romania) Velocrosul Castanilor and Balcan Championship, Florești	NE	Cristian Stan (ROU)	ACS Living Bike	
13–15 November 2026	(Romania) Vatra Dornei CX Cup, Vatra Dornei	NE			
5 December 2026	(Romania) Cluj Winter Race, Cluj-Napoca	NE			
12 December 2026	(Romania) MTB Academy CX Cup, Bucharest	NE			

=== 2026 Slovak Cup (NoLimited Cup) ===
Date	Course	Class	Winner	Team	References
27 September 2026	(Slovakia) NoLimited Cup #1, Levoča	C2	Michal Šichta (SVK)		
11 October 2026	(Slovakia) NoLimited Cup #2, Podbrezová	C2	Marek Konwa (POL)	TJ Auto Škoda MB	
18 October 2026	(Slovakia) NoLimited Cup #3, Trnava	C2	Michal Šichta (SVK)		
24 October 2026	(Slovakia) NoLimited Cup #4, Topoľčianky	C2	Barnabás Vas (HUN)		
25 October 2026	(Slovakia) NoLimited Cup #5, Topoľčianky	C2	Marek Konwa (POL)	TJ Auto Škoda MB	
8 November 2026	(Slovakia) NoLimited Cup #6, Sereď	NE	Michal Kacina (SVK)	Climberg Sport Team	
21 November 2026	(Slovakia) NoLimited Cup #7, Šamorín	C1			
22 November 2026	(Slovakia) NoLimited Cup #8, Šamorín	C2			
5 December 2026	(Slovakia) NoLimited Cup #9, Selce	NE	Part of National Championships		
6 December 2026	(Slovakia) NoLimited Cup #10, Selce	C2			

=== 2026 Slovenian Cup (Pokala Slovenije v ciklokrosu) ===
Date	Course	Class	Winner	Team	References
29 November 2026	(Slovenia) Slovenian Cup #1, Vrhnika	NE			
6 December 2026	(Slovenia) Slovenian Cup #2, Polzela	NE			
13 December 2026	(Slovenia) Slovenian Cup #3, Murska Sobota	NE			
26 December 2026	(Slovenia) Slovenian Cup #4, Ljubljana	NE			
29 December 2026	(Slovenia) Slovenian Cup #5, Municipality of Straža	NE	Part of National Championships		

=== 2026 Copa de España de Ciclocross ===
Date	Course	Class	Winner	Team	References
4 October 2026	(Spain) Copa de España de Ciclo-cross #1 - Gran Premio Ayuntamiento de Siero, Siero	C2	Raúl Mira (ESP)	Nesta - MMR CX Team	
11 October 2026	(Spain) Copa de España de Ciclo-cross #2 - Ciclocross Internacional Xaxancx - Ence, Marín	C2	Miguel Rodríguez (ESP)		
31 October 2026	(Spain) Copa de España #3 - Amurrioko Ziklokrossa, Amurrio	C2	Felipe Orts (ESP)	La Vila Joiosa - Fundación Euskadi	
14 November 2026	(Spain) Copa de España de Ciclo-cross #4 - G.P KH7, Les Franqueses del Vallès	C1	Gonzalo Inguanzo (ESP)		
5 December 2026	(Spain) Copa de España de Ciclo-cross #5 - XI Ciclocross Internacional Ciutat de Xàtiva, Xàtiva	C2			
6 December 2026	(Spain) Copa de España de Ciclo-cross #6 - IV Trofeo Ciclo-Cross Rafa Valls - Fira Tots Sants, Cocentaina	C2			

=== 2026 Swedish Cup (SWE Cup) ===
Date	Course	Class	Winner	Team	References
10 October 2026	(Sweden) Stockholm Cyclocross Weekend Day 1, Stockholm	C2	Thomas Mein (GBR)	Hope Factory Racing	
11 October 2026	(Sweden) Stockholm Cyclocross Weekend Day 1, Stockholm	C2	Thomas Mein (GBR)	Hope Factory Racing	
17 October 2026	(Sweden) Varberg Cyclocross Day 1, Varberg	NE	Clément Horny (BEL)	BH-Wallonie MTB Team	
18 October 2026	(Sweden) Varberg Cyclocross Day 2, Varberg	NE	Clément Horny (BEL)	BH-Wallonie MTB Team	

=== 2026 Swiss Cyclocross Cup ===
Date	Course	Class	Winner	Team	References
11 October 2026	(Switzerland) Swiss Cyclocross Cup #1 – Radquer Steinmaur, Steinmaur	C2	Finn Treudler (SUI)	Heizomat - Cube	
18 October 2026	(Switzerland) Swiss Cyclocross Cup #2 – AlperoseQuer Schneisingen, Schneisingen	C2	Kevin Kuhn (SUI)	Heizomat - Cube	
25 October 2026	(Switzerland) Swiss Cyclocross Cup #3 – Radquer Mettmenstetten, Mettmenstetten	C2	Finn Treudler (SUI)	Heizomat - Cube	
22 November 2026	(Switzerland) Swiss Cyclocross Cup #4 – Radquer Hittnau, Hittnau	C2			

=== 2026 USCX series ===
Date	Course	Class	Winner	Team	References
19 September 2026	(United States) Trek USCX #1 - Rochester Cyclocross, Rochester	C1	Miles Mattern (USA)	CXD Trek Bikes	
20 September 2026	(United States) Trek USCX #2 - Rochester Cyclocross, Rochester	C2	Tofik Beshir (ETH)	CXD Trek Bikes	
26 September 2026	(United States) Trek USCX #3 - Virginia's Blue Ridge Go Cross, Roanoke	C1	Tofik Beshir (ETH)	CXD Trek Bikes	
27 September 2026	(United States) Trek USCX #4 - Virginia's Blue Ridge Go Cross, Roanoke	C2	Tofik Beshir (ETH)	CXD Trek Bikes	
3 October 2026	(United States) Trek USCX #5 - Charm City Cross, Baltimore	C1	Tofik Beshir (ETH)	CXD Trek Bikes	
4 October 2026	(United States) Trek USCX #6 - Charm City Cross, Baltimore	C2	Tofik Beshir (ETH)	CXD Trek Bikes	

== Regional National Cups Men's Elite ==
=== France ===
==== Auvergne-Rhône-Alpes ====
===== Ain =====
Date	Course	Class	Winner	Team	References
26 September 2026	(France) Cyclo-cross de Neuville-les-Dames, Neuville-les-Dames	NE	Kerrian Masset (FRA)	Chambéry Cyclisme Compétition	
3 October 2026	(France) Cyclo-cross de Cormoz, Cormoz	NE	Kerrian Masset (FRA)	Chambéry Cyclisme Compétition	
18 October 2026	(France) Cyclo Cross d’Arbent, Arbent	NE	Cancelled		
25 October 2026	(France) Cyclo-Cross de Treffort, Val-Revermont	NE	Enzo Panizzi (FRA)	Association Entente Cycliste de Saint-Priest	

===== Allier =====
Date	Course	Class	Winner	Team	References
3 October 2026	(France) Cyclo-Cross du complexe sportif Roger Walkowiak, Cusset	NE	Quentin Navarro (FRA)	EC Clermont-Ferrand	
25 October 2026	(France) Cyclo-cross de Désertines, Désertines	NE	Cyrian Merlin (FRA)	Montluçon Cyclisme	
1 November 2026	(France) Cyclo-Cross des Champins de la Moulins, Moulins	NE	Quentin Navarro (FRA)	EC Clermont-Ferrand	
8 November 2026	(France) Cyclo-cross des Ozières, Yzeure	NE	Tanguy Loisy (FRA)	EC Clermont-Ferrand	

===== Drôme =====
Date	Course	Class	Winner	Team	References
27 September 2026	(France) Cyclo-cross de Pierrelatte, Pierrelatte	NE	Evan Jullian (FRA)	Martigues Sport Cyclisme	
10 October 2026	(France) Cyclo-cross de Saint-Rambert-d'Albon, Saint-Rambert-d'Albon	NE	Damien Béton (FRA)	Union Cycliste Pélussin Loire Pilat	
18 October 2026	(France) Cyclo-Cross d’Andancette, Andancette	NE	Lohan Bariot (FRA)	VS Hyérois	
25 October 2026	(France) Cyclo-Cross de Bren, Bren	NE	Tristan Delacroix (FRA)	AVC Aix Provence Dole	
1 November 2026	(France) Cyclo-cross de Valence, Valence	NE	Damien Béton (FRA)	UC Pélussin Loire Pilat	
11 November 2026	(France) Cyclo-cross de Saint-Sorlin-en-Valloire, Saint-Sorlin-en-Valloire	NE	Hugo Pigeon (FRA)	Creuse Oxygene	

===== Isère =====
Date	Course	Class	Winner	Team	References
13 September 2026	(France) Cyclo-cross de Pont-de-Chéruy, Pont-de-Chéruy	NE	Guillaume Bagou (FRA)	Charvieu-Chavagneux Isère Cyclisme	
19 September 2026	(France) Cyclo-Cross de Chavanoz, Chavanoz	NE	Damien Béton (FRA)	UC Pélussin Loire Pilat	
4 October 2026	(France) Cyclo-cross de Montferrat, Montferrat	NE	Kerrian Masset (FRA)	Chambéry Cyclisme Compétition	
11 October 2026	(France) Cyclo-cross de Rives, Rives	NE	Kerrian Masset (FRA)	Chambéry Cyclisme Compétition	
1 November 2026	(France) Cyclo-Cross du GAEC du Gua, Fitilieu	NE	Pierre Martin (FRA)	V.C. Cluses Scionzier	
7 November 2026	(France) Cyclo-cross de Saint-Quentin-Fallavier, Saint-Quentin-Fallavier	NE	Damien Béton (FRA)	UC Pélussin Loire Pilat	
14 November 2026	(France) Cyclo-cross de Fontaine, Fontaine	NE	Kerrian Masset (FRA)	Chambéry Cyclisme Compétition	

===== Loire =====
Date	Course	Class	Winner	Team	References
25 October 2026	(France) Cyclo-cross de Firminy, Firminy	NE	Kerrian Masset (FRA)	Chambéry Cyclisme Compétition	
1 November 2026	(France) Cyclo-Cross de Saint-Jean-Bonnefonds, Saint-Jean-Bonnefonds	NE	Eliott Austin (FRA)	VC Roannais	
8 November 2026	(France) Cyclo-Cross de Montbrison, Montbrison	NE	Eliott Austin (FRA)	VC Roannais	
11 November 2026	(France) Cyclo-cross de Belmont-de-la-Loire, Belmont-de-la-Loire	NE	Sébastien Hoareau (FRA)	VC Villefranche Beaujolais	
15 November 2026	(France) Cyclo-cross de Saint-Galmier, Saint-Galmier	NE	Allan Crozier (FRA)	VCR	

===== Haute-Loire =====
Date	Course	Class	Winner	Team	References
31 October 2026	(France) Cyclocross de Brioude, Brioude	NE	Lucas Serrières (FRA)	Team Atria-Clermont-Ferrand	

===== Puy-de-Dôme =====
Date	Course	Class	Winner	Team	References
4 October 2026	(France) Cyclo-cross d'Ambert, Ambert	NE	Matthieu Jacquin (FRA)	XC63	
18 October 2026	(France) Cyclo-Cross de Perrier, Perrier	NE	Cancelled		
7 November 2026	(France) Cyclo-cross de Romagnat, Romagnat	NE	Quentin Navarro (FRA)	EC Clermont-Ferrand	
14 November 2026	(France) Cyclo-cross de Cournon – Trophée Groupama, Cournon-d'Auvergne	NE	Tanguy Loisy (FRA)	EC Clermont-Ferrand	

===== Rhône Métropole de Lyon =====
Date	Course	Class	Winner	Team	References
18 October 2026	(France) Cyclo-Cross des Mûriers, Saint-Laurent-de-Mure	NE	Léo Seyvet (FRA)	Corbas Lyon Métropole	
31 October 2026	(France) Cyclo-cross de Meyzieu, Meyzieu	NE	Louis Jumeaux (FRA)	Team Macadam's Cowboys	
1 November 2026	(France) Cyclo-Cross de Belleville, Belleville	NE	Léo Seyvet (FRA)	Corbas Lyon Métropole	
8 November 2026	(France) Cyclo-Cross de Saint-Martin-en-Haut, Saint-Martin-en-Haut	NE	Nicolas Bonnefoy (FRA)	C.R.4 Chemins/Roanne	
15 November 2026	(France) Cyclo-cross d'Anse, Anse	NE	Hugo Pigeon (FRA)	Creuse Oxygene	

===== Savoie =====
Date	Course	Class	Winner	Team	References
17 October 2026	(France) Cyclo-Cross de La Motte-Servolex, La Motte-Servolex	NE	Kerrian Masset (FRA)	Chambéry Cyclisme Compétition	

===== Haute-Savoie =====
Date	Course	Class	Winner	Team	References
4 October 2026	(France) Cyclo-cross de Samoëns, Samoëns	NE	Timéo Roux (FRA)	Mont Blanc Arve VTT	
17 October 2026	(France) Cyclo-Cross de Passy – Jour 1, Passy	NE	Quentin Luchini (FRA)	Ain Cyclisme Académie	
18 October 2026	(France) Cyclo-Cross de Passy – Jour 2, Passy	NE	Kerrian Masset (FRA)	Chambéry Cyclisme Compétition	
24 October 2026	(France) Cyclo Cross Nocturne de Villaz, Villaz	NE	Clément Auvin (FRA)	OC GIF VTT	

==== Bourgogne-Franche-Comté ====
Date	Course	Class	Winner	Team	References
2–3 January 2027	(France) Championnat régional Bourgogne Franche-Comté, Dijon	NE			

===== Doubs =====
Date	Course	Class	Winner	Team	References
20 September 2026	(France) Cyclo-cross de Pontarlier, Pontarlier	NE	Cancelled		
26 September 2026	(France) Cyclo-cross du Val de Morteau, Val de Morteau	NE	Flavien Nicolet (FRA)	VC Ornans	
11 October 2026	(France) Cyclo-cross de Montbéliard, Montbéliard	NE	Timéo Louison (FRA)	AC Bisontine	
18 October 2026	(France) Cyclo-cross de Pont de Roide Vermondans, Pont-de-Roide-Vermondans	NE	Paul Goux (FRA)	AC Bisontine	
1 November 2026	(France) Cyclo-Cross de Geneuille, Geneuille	NE	Antoine Simonin (FRA)	VC Valdahon Val de Vennes	
7 November 2026	(France) Cyclo-cross d'Arçon, Arçon	NE	Cancelled		
7 November 2026	(France) Cyclo-cross Morteau II, Val de Morteau	NE	Paul Goux (FRA)	AC Bisontine	
21 November 2026	(France) Cyclo-cross de Maiche, Maîche	NE	Timéo Gantois (FRA)	Bourg-en-Bresse Ain Cyclisme	
27 December 2026	(France) Cyclo-cross de Valdahon, Valdahon	NE			
17 January 2027	(France) Cyclo cross d'Ornans, Ornans	NE			

===== Jura =====
Date	Course	Class	Winner	Team	References
27 September 2026	(France) Cyclo-cross de Quintigny, Quintigny	NE	Flavien Nicolet (FRA)	VC Ornans	
8 November 2026	(France) Cyclo-cross de Lons-le-Saunier, Lons-le-Saunier	NE	Alexis Vivot (FRA)	VC Dolois	
14 November 2026	(France) Cyclo-cross de Vers en Montagne - Souvenir René Jacques, Vers-en-Montagne	NE	Timéo Gantois (FRA)	Bourg-en-Bresse Ain Cyclisme	
15 November 2026	(France) Cyclo-cross de Dole - Crissey, Crissey	NE	Paul Goux (FRA)	AC Bisontine	
5 December 2026	(France) Cyclo-cross d'Arbois, Arbois	NE			
6 December 2026	(France) Cyclo-cross Val d'Amour - Mont/Vaudrey, Bans	NE			
13 December 2026	(France) Cyclo-cross de Ruffey-Desnes, Desnes	NE			

===== Nièvre =====
Date	Course	Class	Winner	Team	References
4 October 2026	(France) Cyclo-cross de Mesves/Loire, Mesves-sur-Loire	NE	Damien Gazut (FRA)	Montluçon cyclisme	
11 October 2026	(France) Cyclo-cross d'Alluy, Alluy	NE	Loic Forestier (FRA)	VS Nivernais Morvan	
18 October 2026	(France) Cyclo-cross Saint Eloi, Saint-Éloi	NE	Cyrian Merlin (FRA)	Montluçon cyclisme	
25 October 2026	(France) CX Niffond, Varennes-Vauzelles	NE	Guillaume Savina (FRA)	VS Nivernais Morvan	
8 November 2026	(France) Cyclo-cross de Châtillon-en-Bazois, Châtillon-en-Bazois	NE	Cancelled		
8 November 2026	(France) Cyclo-cross de Coulanges-lès-Nevers, Coulanges-lès-Nevers	NE	Damien Gazut (FRA)	Montluçon Cyclisme	
15 November 2026	(France) Cyclo-cross de Magny Cours, Magny-Cours	NE	Brice Dujardin (FRA)	UC Felletin	
22 November 2026	(France) Cyclo-cross de Château-Chinon, Château-Chinon (Ville)	NE	Jason Ansard (FRA)	Guidon Chalettois	
29 November 2026	(France) Cyclo-cross de Chaulgnes, Chaulgnes	NE			
5 December 2026	(France) Cyclo-cross de la Municipalité de Garchizy, Garchizy	NE			
6 December 2026	(France) Prix de la Municipalité – Souvenir Jean-Luc Vernisse, Nevers	NE			

===== Haute-Saône =====
Date	Course	Class	Winner	Team	References
4 October 2026	(France) Cyclo-cross de la CAV, Vaivre-et-Montoille	NE	Félix Maire (FRA)	VC Morteau Montbenoit	
8 November 2026	(France) Cyclo-cross de Mélisey, Mélisey	NE	Paul Goux (FRA)	AC Bisontine	
29 November 2026	(France) Cyclo-cross de Rioz, Rioz	NE			

===== Saône-et-Loire =====
Date	Course	Class	Winner	Team	References
17 October 2026	(France) Cyclo-cross de Chalon-sur-Saône, Chalon-sur-Saône	NE	Cancelled		
18 October 2026	(France) Cyclo-cross de Mâcon, Mâcon	NE	Sébastien Hoareau (FRA)	VC Villefranche Beaujolais	
11 November 2026	(France) Cyclo-cross de Bourbon Lancy, Bourbon-Lancy	NE	Nathan Dos Reis Graça (FRA)	EC Clermont-Ferrand	
29 November 2026	(France) Cyclo-cross du Creusot, Le Creusot	NE			

===== Territoire de Belfort =====
Date	Course	Class	Winner	Team	References
25 October 2026	(France) Cyclo-cross de Belfort, Belfort	NE	Paul Goux (FRA)	AC Bisontine	
11 November 2026	(France) Cyclo-cross Belfort Citadelle, Belfort	NE	Paul Goux (FRA)	AC Bisontine	
6 December 2026	(France) Cyclo-cross du Malsaucy, Sermamagny	NE			
19 December 2026	(France) Cyclo-cross de la Douce à Belfort, Belfort	NE			
20 December 2026	(France) Cyclo-cross Souvenir Roland Canal, Belfort	NE			

===== Yonne =====
Date	Course	Class	Winner	Team	References
25 October 2026	(France) Cyclocross du VCA, Auxerre	NE	Cancelled		
31 October 2026	(France) Cyclo-cross de Puisaye, Saint-Sauveur-en-Puisaye	NE	Damien Gazut (FRA)	Montluçon Cyclisme	
1 November 2026	(France) Cyclo-cross de Soucy, Soucy	NE	Damien Gazut (FRA)	Montluçon Cyclisme	
11 November 2026	(France) Cyclo-cross d'Auxerre, Auxerre	NE	Aurelien Philibert (FRA)	Team Vittel N'side	
29 November 2026	(France) Cyclo-cross d'Auxerre, Auxerre	NE			
6 December 2026	(France) Cyclo-cross d'Escamps – Championnat 89, Escamps	NE			
13 December 2026	(France) Cyclo-cross d'Appoigny, Appoigny	NE			
13 December 2026	(France) Cyclo-cross d'Auxerre, Auxerre	NE			

==== Brittany ====
===== 2026 Challenge des Sous-Bois Cre'actuel =====
Date	Course	Class	Winner	Team	References
27 September 2026	(France) Challenge des Sous-Bois Cre'actuel #1, Argentré-du-Plessis	NE	Lohan Bariot (FRA)	VS Hyérois	
4 October 2026	(France) Challenge des Sous-Bois Cre'actuel #2, Domloup	NE	Paul-François Jutel (FRA)	Veloplaiz	
11 October 2026	(France) Challenge des Sous-Bois Cre'actuel #3, Dol-de-Bretagne	NE	Enzo Guerillon (FRA)	Team Sprint Energy	
25 October 2026	(France) Challenge des Sous-Bois Cre'actuel #4, Pleudihen-sur-Rance	NE			
11 November 2026	(France) Challenge des Sous-Bois Cre'actuel #5, Saint-Jacques-de-la-Lande	NE			
13 December 2026	(France) Challenge des Sous-Bois Cre'actuel #6, Saint-Congard	NE			
17 January 2027	(France) Challenge des Sous-Bois Cre'actuel #7 (Finals), Iffendic	NE			

===== 2026 Challenge de Cornouaille Sud =====
Date	Course	Class	Winner	Team	References
4 October 2026	(France) Challenge de Cornouaille Sud #1, Quimper	NE	Louis Tanguy (FRA)	ACT Cycling APE	
25 October 2026	(France) Challenge de Cornouaille Sud #2, Quimperlé	NE			
1 November 2026	(France) Challenge de Cornouaille Sud #3, Ergué-Gabéric	NE			
7–8 November 2026	(France) Challenge de Cornouaille Sud #4, Scaër	NE			
15 November 2026	(France) Challenge de Cornouaille Sud #5, Mellac	NE			
20 December 2026	(France) Challenge de Cornouaille Sud #6, Trégunc	NE			

===== 2026 Coupe de Bretagne =====
Date	Course	Class	Winner	Team	References
17 October 2026	(France) Coupe de Bretagne #1, Plouaret	NE			
18 October 2026	(France) Coupe de Bretagne #2, Trévé	NE			
8 November 2026	(France) Coupe de Bretagne #3, Scaër	NE			
2 January 2027	(France) Coupe de Bretagne #4, Camors	NE			
17 January 2027	(France) Coupe de Bretagne #5 (Finals), Iffendic	NE			

===== 2026 Challenge du Bout du Monde CX =====
Date	Course	Class	Winner	Team	References
3 October 2026	(France) Cyclo-cross du Kan, Pleyber-Christ	NE	Nicolas David (FRA)	CC Ergué-Gabéric	
11 October 2026	(France) Cyclo-cross de Ménéham à Kerlouan, Kerlouan	NE	Louis Tanguy (FRA)	ACT Cycling	
31 October 2026	(France) Cyclo-cross de Pencran, Pencran	NE			
22 November 2026	(France) Cyclo-cross des 3 Moutons, Lampaul-Ploudalmézeau	NE			

===== 2026 Coupe du Conseil du Morbihan de cyclo-cross =====
Date	Course	Class	Winner	Team	References
10 October 2026	(France) Cyclo-cross de Saint-Guyomard, Saint-Guyomard	NE	Victor Dréano (FRA)	VC Pays de Lorient	
25 October 2026	(France) Cyclo-cross de Questembert, Questembert	NE			
11 November 2026	(France) Cyclo-cross de Cranne en Baud, Baud	NE			
22 November 2026	(France) Cyclo-cross de Brandivy, Brandivy	NE			
13 December 2026	(France) Cyclo-cross de Séglien, Séglien	NE			
27 December 2026	(France) Cyclo-cross de La Chapelle-Neuve, La Chapelle-Neuve	NE			

===== 2026–27 Challenge de la Petite Mer de cyclo-cross =====
Date	Course	Class	Winner	Team	References
11 October 2026	(France) Américan Cross Santa Anna, Sainte-Anne-d'Auray	NE	No Elite here		
25 October 2026	(France) Cyclo-cross de Questembert, Questembert	NE			
11 November 2026	(France) Cyclo-cross de Cranne en Baud, Baud	NE			
15 November 2026	(France) Cyclo-cross de Locminé, Locminé	NE			
22 November 2026	(France) Cyclo-cross de Brandivy, Brandivy	NE			
13 December 2026	(France) Cyclo-cross de Séglien, Séglien	NE			
3 January 2026	(France) Cyclo-cross de Grand-Champ – Souvenir Didier Le Prévost, Grand-Champ	NE			
17 January 2027	(France) Cyclo-Cross de Auray, Auray	NE			

===== 2026–27 Challenge 22 de cyclo-cross =====
Date	Course	Class	Winner	Team	References
14 November 2026	(France) Challenge 22 de cyclo-cross #1, Rostrenen	NE			
13 December 2026	(France) Challenge 22 de cyclo-cross #2, Lantic	NE			
19 December 2026	(France) Challenge 22 de cyclo-cross #3, Lannion	NE			

===== 2026–27 Regional Championships =====
====== Departament Côtes-d'Armor ======
Date	Course	Class	Winner	Team	References
29 November 2026	(France) Regional Championships Côtes-d'Armor, Corseul	NE			

====== Departament Finistère ======
Date	Course	Class	Winner	Team	References
29 November 2026	(France) Regional Championships Finistère, Le Drennec	NE			

====== Departament Ille-et-Vilaine ======
Date	Course	Class	Winner	Team	References
29 November 2026	(France) Regional Championships Ille-et-Vilaine, Cesson-Sévigné	NE			

====== Departament Morbihan ======
Date	Course	Class	Winner	Team	References
29 November 2026	(France) Regional Championships Morbihan, Gourin	NE			

====== 2026 Regional Bretagne Championships ======
Date	Course	Class	Winner	Team	References
5–6 December 2026	(France) Regional Bretagne Championships, Verne	NE			

Date	Course	Class	Winner	Team	References
10 October 2026	(France) Cyclo-Cross de Coray, Coray	NE	Cancelled		
24 October 2026	(France) Cyclo-Cross de Châteauneuf-du-Faou, Châteauneuf-du-Faou	NE	Cancelled		
11 November 2026	(France) Cyclo-Cross de Plonéour-Lanvern, Plonéour-Lanvern	NE			
19 December 2026	(France) Cyclocross de Lannion-Brélévenez, Lannion	NE			
24 January 2027	(France) Américan Cross Pacé, Pacé	NE	No Elite here		

==== Centre-Val de Loire ====
Date	Course	Class	Winner	Team	References
11 October 2026	(France) Cyclo-cross de Saint-Denis-de-l'Hôtel, Saint-Denis-de-l'Hôtel	NE			
7 November 2026	(France) Cyclo-cross de Crevant, Crevant	NE			
28 November 2026	(France) Cyclo-cross de Descarte, Descartes	NE			
5 December 2026	(France) Cyclo-cross de Saint-Maurice-Saint-Germain, Saint-Maurice-Saint-Germain	NE			

==== Grand Est ====
===== Coupe Grand Est de Cyclo Cross 2026 =====
Date	Course	Class	Winner	Team	References
4 October 2026	(France) Brumath Bike Festival, Brumath	C2	Giel Lejeune (BEL)	Alpecin–Premier Tech	
15 November 2026	(France) Cyclo-Cross Metz Bellecroix, Metz	NE			
6 December 2026	(France) Cyclo cross de Sécheval, Sécheval	NE			

Date	Course	Class	Winner	Team	References
20 September 2026	(France) Cyclo-Cross de Ste Marguerite, Sainte-Marguerite	NE	Cancelled		
20 September 2026	(France) Cyclo-Cross de Tagolsheim, Tagolsheim	NE	Hugo Hofstetter (FRA)	NSN Cycling Team	
26 September 2026	(France) Cyclo-cross de la Mauselaine, Gérardmer	NE	Caliste Chainel (FRA)	Club Cycliste	
27 September 2026	(France) Cyclo-Cross de Vittel, Vittel	NE	Cancelled		
27 September 2026	(France) Cyclo Cross de Bischwiller, Bischwiller	NE	Nathan Meiller (FRA)	VC Unité Schwenheim	
27 September 2026	(France) Cyclo-cross de Boulzicourt, Boulzicourt	NE	Cancelled		
3 October 2026	(France) Brumath Bike Festival REG U19 et +, Brumath	NE	Caliste Chainel (FRA)	Club Cycliste	
4 October 2026	(France) Cyclo-cross de Bayel, Bayel	NE	Cancelled		
11 October 2026	(France) Cyclo-Cross d'Uxegney, Uxegney	NE	Eloi Collier (FRA)	Cycle Golbéen	
11 October 2026	(France) Cyclo-cross de Pfastatt-Luttenbach, Lutterbach	NE	Cancelled		
18 October 2026	(France) Cyclo-cross de la Ville de Jarny, Jarny	NE	Auxence Portal (FRA)	VTT Fun Club	
18 October 2026	(France) Cyclo-Cross de St Bernard, Saint-Bernard	NE	Victor Thomas (FRA)	AC Erstein	
18 October 2026	(France) CC de Saulxures sur Moselotte, Saulxures-sur-Moselotte	NE	Maël Savignard (FRA)	Vélo Sprint Anould	
24 October 2026	(France) Cyclo-cross d'Hettange Grande, Hettange-Grande	NE			
25 October 2026	(France) Cyclo cross de Neuves Maisons, Neuves-Maisons	NE			
25 October 2026	(France) Cyclo-cross de Nouvion-sur-Meuse, Nouvion-sur-Meuse	NE			

==== Normandy ====
===== 2026–27 Coupe de Normandie =====
Date	Course	Class	Winner	Team	References
11 October 2026	(France) Coupe de Normandie #1 - Souvenir Yves Libor, Martinvast	NE			

===== 2026–27 Challenge Eric Duchemin Assurances =====
Date	Course	Class	Winner	Team	References
20 September 2026	(France) Challenge Eric Duchemin Assurances #1, Valognes	NE	Joris Lepoittevin-Dubost (FRA)	Team Bricquebec Cotentin	
1 November 2026	(France) Challenge Eric Duchemin Assurances #2, Portbail	NE			
27 December 2026	(France) Challenge Eric Duchemin Assurances #3, Pirou	NE			

Date	Course	Class	Winner	Team	References
27 September 2026	(France) Cyclo-cross de Saint-Hilaire-du-Harcouët, Saint-Hilaire-du-Harcouët	NE	Cancelled		
4 October 2026	(France) Cyclo-cross Souvenir Daniel-Hardy, La Ferté Macé	NE	Cyprien Gilles (FRA)	ES Torigni	
18 October 2026	(France) Cyclo-cross de Saint-Bômer-les-Forges, Saint-Bômer-les-Forges	NE			

==== Nouvelle-Aquitaine ====
Date	Course	Class	Winner	Team	References
27 September 2026	(France) Cyclo-cross de Sainte-Soulle, Sainte-Soulle	NE	Clément Bureau (FRA)	TC Le Château d'Oléron	
4 October 2026	(France) Cyclo-cross Saint-Martin-de-Seignanx, Saint-Martin-de-Seignanx	NE	Thomas Bareille (FRA)	US Saint-Palais Amikuze Cyclisme	

===== 2026 Trophées Cyclo-cross de la Vienne =====
Date	Course	Class	Winner	Team	References
27 September 2026	(France) Cyclo-cross de Saulgé, Saulgé	NE	Joan Dupuy (FRA)	P.Saint-Florent Niort	
4 October 2026	(France) Cyclo-cross de Naintré, Naintré	NE	Mathieu Morichon (FRA)	TC Le Château d'Oléron	
11 October 2026	(France) Cyclo-cross de Vouillé, Vouillé	NE			

==== Occitanie ====
Date	Course	Class	Winner	Team	References
4 October 2026	(France) 10ème Cyclo-cross de Castelsarrasin, Castelsarrasin	NE			
11 October 2026	(France) Cyclo-cross de Rodez - Parc de Vabre, Rodez	NE			
18 October 2026	(France) Cyclo-cross Comminges Bike, Landorthe	NE			

==== Pays de la Loire ====
Date	Course	Class	Winner	Team	References
20 September 2026	(France) Cyclo-cross de Grez-Neuville, Grez-Neuville	NE	Quentin Du Mouza (FRA)	C'Chartres Cyclisme	
26 September 2026	(France) Cyclo-cross de Palluau, Palluau	NE	Armand Trouillard (FRA)	Durtal Vélo Sport	
27 September 2026	(France) Cyclo-cross de Nogent-le-Bernard, Nogent-le-Bernard	NE	Simon Lepoittevin-Dubost (FRA)	EC Saint-Vigorienne	
27 September 2026	(France) Cyclo-cross de Notre-Dame-de-Riez, Notre-Dame-de-Riez	NE	Adrien Billet (FRA)	Team LMP-La Roche Vendée Cyclisme	
10 October 2026	(France) Cyclo-cross de Saint-Sébastien-sur-Loire, Saint-Sébastien-sur-Loire	NE			

==== 2026 Coupe Pays de la Loire de Cyclo–cross ====
Date	Course	Class	Winner	Team	References
4 October 2026	(France) Cyclo-cross de Vaiges, Vaiges	NE	Amaury Verger (FRA)	Team AD REV	
17 October 2026	(France) Cyclo-cross de Saint-Mars-d'Outillé, Saint-Mars-d'Outillé	NE			
31 October 2026	(France) Cyclo-cross de Machecoul-Saint-Même, Machecoul-Saint-Même	NE			
14 November 2026	(France) Cyclo-cross de Durtal, Durtal	NE			
20 December 2026	(France) Cyclo-cross de Saint-Jean-de-Monts, Saint-Jean-de-Monts	NE			

==== Provence-Alpes-Côte d'Azur ====
Date	Course	Class	Winner	Team	References
20 September 2026	(France) Cyclo-cross de Bollène, Bollène	NE	Evan Jullian (FRA)	Martigues SC	
3 October 2026	(France) Cyclo-cross de Bormes-les-Mimosas, Bormes-les-Mimosas	NE	Cancelled		
11 October 2026	(France) Cyclo-cross de la Colline Saint-Eutrope, Orange	NE			
11 October 2026	(France) 24ème GPX de La Graille, Saint-Saturnin-lès-Avignon	NE	Cancelled		
17 October 2026	(France) Cyclo-cross de Gap, Gap	NE			
18 October 2026	(France) Cyclo-cross de Eygliers, Eygliers	NE	Cancelled		
18 October 2026	(France) Cyclo-Cross de Château-Gombert, Eygliers	NE	Cancelled		

===== 2026 Challenge Cyclocross Aubagnais =====
Date	Course	Class	Winner	Team	References
4 October 2026	(France) Cyclo-cross d'Aubagne #1, Aubagne	NE	Ivan Schmitz (FRA)	ES Cavaillon	
13 December 2026	(France) Cyclo-cross d'Aubagne #2, Aubagne	NE			

=== Germany ===
Date	Course	Class	Winner	Team	References
12 September 2026	(Germany) 2. Baunataler Cyclocross, Baunatal	NE	Matteo Oberteicher (GER)	RC Endspurt Herford	
10 October 2026	(Germany) GaloppCross, Bremen	NE	Jonas Köpsel (GER)	Radsport Nagel CX Team	
11 October 2026	(Germany) 7. Cross am Park, Blankenfelde-Mahlow	NE	Erik Schulze (GER)	RadTeam Seidel Luckenwalde	

==== 2026 STEVENS Cyclo-Cross-Cup ====
Date	Course	Class	Winner	Team	References
27 September 2026	(Germany) 2026 STEVENS Cyclo-Cross-Cup #1, Neu Duvenstedt	NE	Henning Peper (GER)	Kieler RV	
3 October 2026	(Germany) 2026 STEVENS Cyclo-Cross-Cup #2, Hanover	NE	Björn Ernst (GER)	Team MaxWatt Men	
4 October 2026	(Germany) 2026 STEVENS Cyclo-Cross-Cup #3, Bad Harzburg	NE	Johannes Feddern (GER)	SV Dassow 24	

==== 2026 Weser-Ems Cup ====
Date	Course	Class	Winner	Team	References
26 September 2026	(Germany) 2026 Weser-Ems Cup #1, Oldenburg	NE	Timo Krone (GER)	RSV Münster	
27 September 2026	(Germany) 2026 Weser-Ems Cup #2, Syke	NE	Luca Bockelmann (GER)	VC Vegesack	

=== Great Britain ===
==== 2026 Yorkshire Cyclo-cross League ====
Date	Course	Class	Winner	Team	References
20 September 2026	(United Kingdom) 2026 Yorkshire Cyclo-cross Championships #1, Wakefield	NE	Jody Mills (GBR)	Zappi Racing Team	

==== 2026 Welsh Cyclo-Cross League ====
Date	Course	Class	Winner	Team	References
20 September 2026	(United Kingdom) ( (Wales) ) 2026 Welsh Cyclo-Cross League #1, Risca	NE	Joseph Beckingsale (GBR)	Mypad Racing p/b ONDO Sports	

==== 2026 East Kent Cyclo-Cross League ====
Date	Course	Class	Winner	Team	References
13 September 2026	(United Kingdom) 2026 East Kent Cyclo-Cross League #1, Sandwich	NE	Luke Gibson (GBR)	O'Neills Spirit	

==== 2026 North West Cyclo-Cross League ====
Date	Course	Class	Winner	Team	References
13 September 2026	(United Kingdom) North West Cyclo-Cross League #1, Manchester	NE	Oscar Shaw (GBR)	ROTOR Race Team	
19 September 2026	(United Kingdom) North West Cyclo-Cross League #2, Cowling	NE	Declan Oldham (GBR)	Hope Factory Racing	

==== 2026 Wessex Cyclocross League ====
Date	Course	Class	Winner	Team	References
6 September 2026	(United Kingdom) Wessex Cyclocross League #1, Clanfield	NE	Jack Morgan (GBR)		
13 September 2026	(United Kingdom) Wessex Cyclocross League #2, Southampton	NE	Niclas Olley (GBR)	Sotonia CC	

==== 2026 West Midlands Cyclo-Cross League ====
Date	Course	Class	Winner	Team	References
6 September 2026	(United Kingdom) West Midlands Cyclo-Cross League #1, Studley	NE	Spencer Corder (GBR)	BCC Race Team	
13 September 2026	(United Kingdom) West Midlands Cyclo-Cross League #2, Shrewsbury	NE	Noah White (GBR)	Lee Valley Junior Cycling Team	

==== 2026 CX North East League ====
Date	Course	Class	Winner	Team	References
13 September 2026	(United Kingdom) CX North East League #1, Middlesbrough	NE	Sam Kettlewell (GBR)	TAAP Kalas	
20 September 2026	(United Kingdom) CX North East League #2, Whitby	NE	Sam Kettlewell (GBR)	TAAP Kalas	

==== 2026 Eastern Cyclo-Cross League ====
Date	Course	Class	Winner	Team	References
6 September 2026	(United Kingdom) Eastern Cyclo-Cross League #1, Chelmsford	NE	Kieran Jarvis (GBR)	Ornata Factory Racing	
13 September 2026	(United Kingdom) Eastern Cyclo-Cross League #2, Lambourne	NE	Kieran Jarvis (GBR)	Ornata Factory Racing	
20 September 2026	(United Kingdom) Eastern Cyclo-Cross League #3, Edwardstone	NE	Kieran Jarvis (GBR)	Ornata Factory Racing	

==== 2026 Sussex Cyclo-Cross League London & South East Cyclo-Cross League ====
Date	Course	Class	Winner	Team	References
6 September 2026	(United Kingdom) Sussex Cyclo-Cross League London & South East Cyclo-Cross League #1, Brighton	NE	Oliver Richardson (GBR)	LCRT	
20 September 2026	(United Kingdom) Sussex Cyclo-Cross League London & South East Cyclo-Cross League #2, Nutley	NE	Oliver Richardson (GBR)	LCRT	

=== Italy ===
==== 2026–27 Selle SMP Master Cross series ====
Date	Course	Class	Winner	Team	References
1 November 2026	(Italy) Trofeo Citta' di Firenze, Florence	C2	Filippo Grigolini (ITA)	Decathlon CMA CGM	
22 November 2026	(Italy) Monselice in Rosa Cross, Monselice	NE			
6 December 2026	(Italy) Ciclocross del Brenta, San Pietro in Gu	C2			
8 December 2026	(Italy) Ciclocross del Ponte, Oderzo	C2			
27 December 2026	(Italy) 13° Trofeo Città di San Fior, San Fior	NE			
3 January 2027	(Italy) Gran Premio Città di Vittorio Veneto, Vittorio Veneto	NE			

==== 2026–27 ACSI Cross Marche series ====
Date	Course	Class	Winner	Team	References
3 October 2026	(Italy) Trofeo Corridomnia - Trofeo Vanity, Corridonia	NE	Yuri Radi (ITA)	I Mulistracchi	
17 October 2026	(Italy) Trofeo Urbisaglia, Urbisaglia	NE	Yuri Radi (ITA)	I Mulistracchi	
7 November 2026	(Italy) 3° Trofeo Ciclocross Laminox – Trofeo Sarnano, Sarnano	NE	Yuri Radi (ITA)	I Mulistracchi	
6 January 2027	(Italy) Trofeo San Girio CX, Porto Potenza Picena	NE			
17 January 2027	(Italy) Trofeo Villa Collio, San Severino Marche	NE			

==== 2026–27 Florence Supercross series ====
Date	Course	Class	Winner	Team	References
11 October 2026	(Italy) Florence Supercross #1, Santa Croce sull'Arno	NE	Leonardo Sestini (ITA)	Crampi di Chianti	
25 October 2026	(Italy) Florence Supercross #2, Rufina	NE	Alberto Prisinzano (ITA)	G.S. Montemarciano	
1 November 2026	(Italy) Florence Supercross #3, Sarmato	NE	Leonardo Galigani (ITA)	UC Seanese	
8 November 2026	(Italy) Florence Supercross #4, Scarperia	NE			
15 November 2026	(Italy) Florence Supercross #5, Pontassieve	NE			
22 November 2026	(Italy) Florence Supercross #6, Impruneta	NE			
29 November 2026	(Italy) Florence Supercross #7, Calenzano	NE			
6 December 2026	(Italy) Florence Supercross #8, Campi Bisenzio	NE			
13 December 2026	(Italy) Florence Supercross #9, Volterra	NE			
20 December 2026	(Italy) Florence Supercross #10, Le Sieci	NE			

==== 2026–27 Adriatico Cross Tour series ====
Date	Course	Class	Winner	Team	References
1 November 2026	(Italy) Adriatico Cross Tour #1, Pianella	NE	Pietro Sebastiani (ITA)	Velo Club Cattolica	
8 November 2026	(Italy) Adriatico Cross Tour #2, Petrignano	NE			
15 November 2026	(Italy) Adriatico Cross Tour #3, Notaresco	NE			
22 November 2026	(Italy) Adriatico Cross Tour #4, Barbara	NE			
6 December 2026	(Italy) Adriatico Cross Tour #5, Narni	NE			
13 December 2026	(Italy) Adriatico Cross Tour #6, Narni	NE			
20 December 2026	(Italy) Adriatico Cross Tour #7, Todi	NE			
3 January 2027	(Italy) Adriatico Cross Tour #8, Cattolica	NE			

==== 2026–27 Mediterraneocross ====
Date	Course	Class	Winner	Team	References
11 October 2026	(Italy) 14° Trofeo Ciclocross Città di Viggiano, Viggiano	NE			

==== 2026–27 Trofeo CX del Sud ====
Date	Course	Class	Winner	Team	References
18 October 2026	(Italy) Trofeo CX del Sud #1, Melito di Napoli	NE			

==== 2026–27 Lazio CX ====
Date	Course	Class	Winner	Team	References
18 October 2026	(Italy) 3° CX Città di Cerveteri - Memorial Enrico Bonomi – Lazio CX #1, Cerveteri	NE	Antonio Folcarelli (ITA)	Race Mountain Folcarelli	
25 October 2026	(Italy) 1° Gran Premio Città di Capalbio – 17° Memorial Romano Scotti – 5# Giro delle Regioni Ciclocross, Capalbio	NE	Part of Giro delle Regioni Ciclocross		
8 December 2026	(Italy) 2° Memorial Petta – Lazio CX #3, Ostia	NE			
13 December 2026	(Italy) Lazio CX #4, Ardea	NE			
27 December 2026	(Italy) Lazio CX #5, Vivaro Romano	NE			

==== 2026 Master Cross Emilia-Romagna ====
Date	Course	Class	Winner	Team	References
18 October 2026	(Italy) Ciclocross dei Laghetti – Master Cross Emilia-Romagna #1, Castelnovo di Sotto	NE			

==== 2026–27 Coppa Piemonte di Ciclocross ====
Date	Course	Class	Winner	Team	References
18 October 2026	(Italy) #1 Coppa Piemonte Ciclocross, Castelletto Cervo	NE			

==== 2026–27 Campionato Italiano di Società Ciclocross ====
Date	Course	Class	Winner	Team	References
27 September 2026	(Italy) 8^ Trofeo Corridomnia – 1#Campionato Italiano Di Societa', Corridonia	NE	Jam's Bike Team Buja	Nicole Tongiorgi; Azzurra Rizzi; Angelica Coluccini; Melissa Plaino; Emma Franceschini; Riccardo Massarutto; Dylan Mazzurco Miritana; Federico Ursella; Luca Tonelli; Alessio Strizzolo; Leonardo Onida; Emanuele Pittoni; Lorenzo Cosatti; Thomas Cargnelutti; Gabriele Molinari; Tommaso Cosatti; Federico Antonello; Gabriele Marroccu; Leonardo Ursella; Denis Galasso; Erik Cargnelutti; Marco Tonelli	
11 October 2026	(Italy) 14° Trofeo Ciclocross Città di Viggiano – 2#Campionato Italiano Di Societa', Viggiano	NE			
18 October 2026	(Italy) Zoncross Classic Naz. – 3#Campionato Italiano Di Societa', Sutrio	NE			
25 October 2026	(Italy) Nazionale Ciclocross - ASD Scotti – 4#Campionato Italiano Di Societa', Capalbio	NE			
6 December 2026	(Italy) Ciclocross dei Pini – 5#Campionato Italiano Di Societa', Narni	NE			
19 December 2026	(Italy) 4° Cleten Cross – 6#Campionato Italiano Di Societa', Sabbio Chiese	NE			

=== Spain ===
==== Aragon ====
===== 2026 Copa Aragonesa CX =====
Date	Course	Class	Winner	Team	References
26 September 2026	(Spain) II Ciclocross Villa de Ágreda, Ágreda	NE	Iván Martínez García (ESP)	Vikings Bike, C.D.	
27 September 2026	(Spain) I Ciclocross Villa de Ólvega, Ólvega	NE	César González Bellido (ESP)	Club Ciclista Turiaso	
21 November 2026	(Spain) V Trofeo CX Margudgued-Boltaña Zona Zero, Boltaña	NE			
22 November 2026	(Spain) V Trofeo CX Castejón de Sos, Castejón de Sos	NE			
13 December 2026	(Spain) IX CX Utebo, Utebo	NE			
19 December 2026	(Spain) IV Ciclocross Ciudad de Tarazona and IV Ciclocross Internacional Ciudad de Tarazona, Tarazona	C2/NE			
20 December 2026	(Spain) V Ciclocross Villa de Los Fayos, Los Fayos	NE			

==== Asturias ====
Date	Course	Class	Winner	Team	References
3 October 2026	(Spain) IV Ciclocross Corneyu CX Team, Llanera	NE	Angel Fernandez Echevarria (ESP)	C.D. Probici	
25 October 2026	(Spain) I Ciclocross Cangas del Narcea, Cangas del Narcea	NE	David Ovin Victorero (ESP)	Sellon Bici Center	
29 November 2026	(Spain) IV Ciclocross Concejo de Piloña, Piloña	NE			
6 December 2026	(Spain) 56 Ciclocross La Tenderina Memorial Amadeo Izquierdo, Oviedo	NE			
12 December 2026	(Spain) CX Villa de Luarca, Luarca	NE			
13 December 2026	(Spain) Ciclocross Villa de Navia – Memorial Andrés Méndez, Navia	NE			

==== Basque Country ====
Date	Course	Class	Winner	Team	References
25 October 2026	(Spain) Ormaiztegiko Liv.Nazioarteko Ziklokrossa, Ormaiztegi	C2	Yorben Lauryssen (BEL)		
1 November 2026	(Spain) El XXXIII Ciclocross Internacional de Karrantza, Karrantza	C2	Cancelled		
1 November 2026	(Spain) Orduña City Cross 2026, Orduña-Urduña	C2	Felipe Orts (ESP)	La Vila Joiosa - Fundación Euskadi	
7 November 2026	(Spain) XI Muskizko Udala Ziklo-Krossa, Muskiz	C2	Gonzalo Inguanzo (ESP)		
15 November 2026	(Spain) Zornotzako Ziklokrosa, Amorebieta-Etxano	NE			
21 November 2026	(Spain) Besa CX Elgoibar, Elgoibar	C2			
22 November 2026	(Spain) Garaje Tolosa Saria – V Memorial Pablo Arsuaga, Tolosa	NE			
28 November 2026	(Spain) Abadiñoko 2026ko Ziklokrosa, Abadiño	NE			
29 November 2026	(Spain) 49. Elorrioko Ziklokrosa, Elorrio	NE			
12 December 2026	(Spain) Gabiriako Ziklokrosa, Gabiria	NE			
13 December 2026	(Spain) VI. Segurako Ziklo Kros Saria, Segura	NE			
19 December 2026	(Spain) III. Ataun San Martin Ziklokrosa, Ataun	NE			
20 December 2026	(Spain) 2027 Euskadiko Ziklo-Kros Txapelketak - Lezamako XVI Ziklokros Zirkuitoa 2026-2027, Lezama	NE			

==== Castilla–La Mancha ====
===== 2026–27 Copa de Ciclocross de Castilla-La Mancha =====
Date	Course	Class	Winner	Team	References
3 October 2026	(Spain) IV Ciclocross Almansa, Almansa	NE	Juan Martínez Mora (ESP)	Samper Team	
11 October 2026	(Spain) Campeonatos de Castilla-La Mancha de CX – Memorial Antonio Fernández Matamoros, Ciudad Real	NE	Mario Castro Sánchez (ESP)	Bicicletas Salchi–Matrix	
1 November 2026	(Spain) Copa de Castilla la Mancha, Seseña - 3ª Cyclocross Racing Cup, Seseña	NE	Emilio Reinoso (ESP)	El Bicho Plataforma Central	
19 December 2026	(Spain) II Ciclocross Tierra de Gigante, Ciudad Real	NE			
20 December 2026	(Spain) I Ciclocros "La Nación", El Bonillo	NE			

==== Castile and León ====
Date	Course	Class	Winner	Team	References
26 September 2026	(Spain) II Ciclocross Villa de Ágreda, Ágreda	NE	Iván Martínez García (ESP)	Vikings Bike, C.D.	
27 September 2026	(Spain) I Ciclocross "Villa De Olvega", Ólvega	NE	César González Bellido (ESP)	Club Ciclista Turiaso	
17 October 2026	(Spain) XXII Ciclocross Ciudad de Medina de Pomar 2026, Medina de Pomar	NE	Gonzalo Inguanzo (ESP)	Supermercados Froiz	
18 October 2026	(Spain) XXIII Ciclocross Villa de Villarcayo 2026, Villarcayo de Merindad de Castilla la Vieja	NE	Unax Galan (ESP)	Occident Miribilla	
7 November 2026	(Spain) VIII Trofeo CX Ciudad de Ávila - GR100, Ávila	NE	Miguel Díaz Pérez (ESP)	Scott Super Cup Team	
8 November 2026	(Spain) I CX Ciudad de Avila Internacional, Ávila	C2	Mario Junquera (ESP)	Unicaja - Gijon	

==== Cantabria ====
===== 2026 Copa Cántabra de Ciclocross =====
Date	Course	Class	Winner	Team	References
8 November 2026	(Spain) Colindres Pueblo 10, Colindres	NE	Unax Lombraña (ESP)	Garribikes CD	
14 November 2026	(Spain) IV Ciclocross Ayto. Arenas de Iguña, Arenas de Iguña	NE			
5 December 2026	(Spain) IV Trofeo Ciclocross Reinosa, Reinosa	NE			
14 December 2026	(Spain) XXV Gran Premio Santa Barbara de Ciclocros 2026, Puente Viesgo	NE			

==== Catalonia ====
Date	Course	Class	Winner	Team	References
10 October 2026	(Spain) Trobada Ciclocròs Cambrils, Cambrils	NE	Cancelled		
25 October 2026	(Spain) CX Manlleu - Trofeu Joan Soler, Manlleu	NE	Aleix Casanovas (ESP)	CC Lleida - Dpedros	
1 November 2026	(Spain) Ciclocross de la Garriga, La Garriga	NE	Tomás Misser (ESP)	Cardedeu Unió Ciclista	
8 November 2026	(Spain) CX Fornells de la Selva, Fornells de la Selva	NE	Aleix Casanovas (ESP)	CC Lleida-DPedrós	
15 November 2026	(Spain) Gran Premi KH-7 Ciclocross, Les Franqueses del Vallès	NE			
21 November 2026	(Spain) VI Ciclocross de Gurb Memorial Lluis Vila i Codina, Gurb	NE			
22 November 2026	(Spain) Ciclocròs Ciutat de Vic, Vic	NE			
28 November 2026	(Spain) GP de La Seu D'Urgell, Lleida	NE			
29 November 2026	(Spain) 6e Gran Premi de la Seu d'Urgell, La Seu d'Urgell	NE			
8 December 2026	(Spain) Trofeu Ciutat de Manresa de Ciclocròs, Manresa	NE			
13 December 2026	(Spain) CX Masquefa, Masquefa	NE			
20 December 2026	(Spain) CX Ciutat de Balaguer - Campionat de Catalunya, Balaguer	NE			

==== Galicia ====
===== 2026–27 Superprestixio CX Galicia =====
Date	Course	Class	Winner	Team	References
27 September 2026	(Spain) I Ciclocross Concello de Chantada, Chantada	NE	Miguel Rodríguez Novoa (ESP)	Supermercados Froiz	
10 October 2026	(Spain) IX Trofeo Ciclocross Avanza Concello do Porriño, O Porriño	NE	Mathieu Morichon (FRA)	C'Chartres Cyclisme	
12 October 2026	(Spain) II Trofeo de Ciclocross Concello de Brión, O Porriño	NE	Cancelled		
25 October 2026	(Spain) III CX Concello de Taboada, Taboada	NE	Iván Feijoo (ESP)	Academia Postal - Maceda	
7 November 2026	(Spain) XXVIII Trofeo Montes de Eiras de Ciclocross, Pontevedra	NE	Néstor Frías (ESP)	CC Ribadumia Bikescola	
8 November 2026	(Spain) V Trofeo Ciclocross Grupeta Pan de Zarko., Villa do Porriño, O Porriño	NE	Néstor Frías (ESP)	CC Ribadumia Bikescola	
21 November 2026	(Spain) VI Ciclocross Cocello de Nigran-ZFV Porto do Molle, Nigrán	NE			
29 November 2026	(Spain) 6º Ciclocross Borja Gómez Méndez, Ponteareas	NE			
8 December 2026	(Spain) X Ciclocross Val de Esmelle, Ferrol	NE			
12 December 2026	(Spain) XXXIX Promoción de Ciclismo de Boiro 2026, Boiro	NE			
13 December 2026	(Spain) Ciclocross Concello de Viveiro, Viveiro	NE			
19 December 2026	(Spain) Montes do Támega, Castrelo do Val	NE	Cancelled		
20 December 2026	(Spain) XIX Ciclocross Castelo de Maceda, Maceda	NE			
27 December 2026	(Spain) Campionato de Galicia de Ciclocross 2027 - IX Ciclocross Concello de Betanzos, Betanzos	NE			

==== Community of Madrid ====
===== 2026 Copa Comunidad de Madrid de Ciclocross =====
Date	Course	Class	Winner	Team	References
4 October 2026	(Spain) VIII Trofeo Ayto. Navalafuente - Copa Comunidad De Madrid De Ciclocross, Navalafuente	NE	Mario Castro Sánchez (ESP)	Bicicletas Salchi Matrix	
14 November 2026	(Spain) V Trofeo CX del Jarama - Copa Comunidad de Madrid, Paracuellos de Jarama	NE			
21 November 2026	(Spain) III Cyclocross Racing Cup - VII Trofeo Ayto. Los Molinos, Los Molinos	NE			
22 November 2026	(Spain) XIII Ciclocross Ayto. Mejorada del Campo - Copa Comunidad de Madrid, Mejorada del Campo	NE			
29 November 2026	(Spain) XXI Ciclocross P.C. Ciclonorte G.P. Villa de Alalpardo - Copa Comunidad de Madrid, Valdeolmos-Alalpardo	NE			
13 December 2026	(Spain) XXII GP CX Ayto. Coslada-Bicicletas Salchi- Campeonato de Madrid, Coslada	NE			

==== Navarra ====
Date	Course	Class	Winner	Team	References
14 November 2026	(Spain) IV Artika CX – Campeonato Navarro de Ciclocross, Artica	NE			

==== Valencian Community ====
===== 2026 Challenge Ciclocross Comunitat Valenciana =====
Date	Course	Class	Winner	Team	References
10 October 2026	(Spain) II Trofeo Ciclocross Construcciones San Jerónimo, Benferri	NE	Manuel Sánchez Aldeguer (ESP)	Helike CC	
11 October 2026	(Spain) Tercer GP Ciclo-Cross Potries, Potríes	NE	Luca Harter (GER)		
17 October 2026	(Spain) XVIII Trofeu Ciclocross Ajuntament de Picassent, Picassent	NE	Marc Moncho (ESP)	Jorge Canet-Restaurante El Rall	
24 October 2026	(Spain) XIII Ciclocross de Aiacor, Canals	NE	Marc Moncho (ESP)	Jorge Canet-Restaurante El Rall	
25 October 2026	(Spain) 11E Trofeu Ciclocross L'Ènova, L'Énova	NE	Marc Moncho (ESP)	Jorge Canet-Restaurante El Rall	
31 October 2026	(Spain) I Trofeo Ciclocross Almoravides, Orihuela	NE	Manuel Sánchez Aldeguer (ESP)	Helike CC	
1 November 2026	(Spain) I Torneo Ciclo-cross Villa de Crevillent, Crevillent	NE	Manuel Sánchez Aldeguer (ESP)	Helike CC	
8 November 2026	(Spain) XXIII Ciclocross Ciutat de Carlet - Memorial Javi Bou, Carlet	NE	Marc Moncho (ESP)	Jorge Canet-Restaurante El Rall	
15 November 2026	(Spain) IV Ciclocross Ciudad del Ciclismo, Cervera del Maestre	NE			
21 November 2026	(Spain) Ciclocross Ciutat de Gandia, Gandia	NE			
22 November 2026	(Spain) XII Trofeu Villa d'Alginet CX, Alginet	NE			
29 November 2026	(Spain) Trofeo Joaquin Ortega - Campeonato Autonomico Com.Valenciana, Alicante	NE			
8 December 2026	(Spain) VI Gran Premi CX Felipe Orts - La Vila Joiosa, Villajoyosa	NE			
13 December 2026	(Spain) II Ciclocross Masia La Safranera - Alcoy, Alcoy	NE			
20 December 2026	(Spain) Ciclocross Tous, Tous	NE			

=== Switzerland ===
Date	Course	Class	Winner	Team	References
1 November 2026	(Switzerland) Hombiquer, Hombrechtikon	NE	Casey Hildebrandt (SUI)	Homegrown Athletics	

==== 2026–27 Omnium Romand de Cyclocross ====
Date	Course	Class	Winner	Team	References
3 October 2026	(Switzerland) Omnium Romand de Cyclocross #1, Diablerets	NE	David Mollard (SUI)	Team Papival Scott Webcaution	
17 October 2026	(Switzerland) Omnium Romand de Cyclocross #2, Corbières	NE	Evan Dély (SUI)	VC Excelsior Martigny / Team Humard VP	
24 October 2026	(Switzerland) Omnium Romand de Cyclocross #3, Aigle	NE	Artur Nichvolodov (UKR)		
8 November 2026	(Switzerland) Omnium Romand de Cyclocross #4, Rennaz	NE			
14 November 2026	(Switzerland) Omnium Romand de Cyclocross #5, Chailly	NE			
21 November 2026	(Switzerland) Omnium Romand de Cyclocross #6, Martigny	NE			
28 November 2026	(Switzerland) Omnium Romand de Cyclocross #7, Porrentruy	NE			
6 December 2026	(Switzerland) Omnium Romand de Cyclocross #8, Bramois	NE			

==== 2026 Afeno Cup ====
Date	Course	Class	Winner	Team	References
3 October 2026	(Switzerland) Afeno Cup #1, Boningen	NE	Milovan Stanic (SUI)	GIANT Gellert-Veloteam	
10 October 2026	(Switzerland) Afeno Cup #2, Riniken	NE	Milovan Stanic (SUI)	GIANT Gellert-Veloteam	
24 October 2026	(Switzerland) Afeno Cup #3, Balsthal	NE	Patrick Amm (SUI)	Gellert-Veloteam	
31 October 2026	(Switzerland) Afeno Cup #4, Brunnersberg	NE	Patrick Amm (SUI)	Gellert-Veloteam	
7 November 2026	(Switzerland) Afeno Cup #5, Möhlin	NE	Kurt Gisler (SUI)		
14 November 2026	(Switzerland) Afeno Cup #6, Muttenz	NE			
21 November 2026	(Switzerland) Afeno Cup #7, Pfaffnau	NE			

== National Cups Women's Elite ==
=== 2026–27 GUNSHA -Cycling Austria CX Cup ===
Date	Course	Class	Winner	Team	References
8 October 2026	(Austria) Quer durchs Stadion – Pernitz, Pernitz	NE	Silke Mair (AUT)	RCO BOA Wels	
11 October 2026	(Austria) 11.King & Queen of Seeschlacht powered by Bikestore.cc, Langenzersdorf	NE	Nadja Heigl (AUT)	KTM Spada powered by Brenta Brakes	
18 October 2026	(Austria) St. Pöltner Querfeldein im Kaiserwald, St. Pölten	NE	Romana Slavinec (AUT)	ARBÖ Rapso Knittelfeld	
24 October 2026	(Austria) Wienenergie Cyclocross Landegg, Pottendorf	NE	Cancelled		
25 October 2026	(Austria) Wienenergie Cyclocross Landegg, Pottendorf	NE	Cancelled		
31 October 2026	(Austria) Mud Master Cyclocross Mittelkärnten, St. Veit an der Glan	NE	Silke Mair (AUT)	RCO BOA Wels	
8 November 2026	(Austria) DWH – dachwelten cross pb Boa Wels, Wels	NE	Silke Mair (AUT)	RCO BOA Wels	
14 November 2026	(Austria) GP Ternitz, Ternitz	NE			
15 November 2026	(Austria) GP Ternitz - Preise des ARBÖ, Ternitz	NE			
21 November 2026	(Austria) 11. Bad Ischler CX, Bad Ischl	NE			
22 November 2026	(Austria) Int. Querfeldein GP Gunskirchen um das Sportzentrum, Gunskirchen	C2			
28 November 2026	(Austria) 2. Erlauftal-Cross, Purgstall an der Erlauf	NE			
29 November 2026	(Austria) Park-Cross, Böheimkirchen	NE			
13 December 2026	(Austria) CX-Mas Cross Volume 4, Markgrafneusiedl	NE			
6 January 2027	(Austria) 3KöniXcrosS, St. Pölten	NE			
9 January 2027	(Austria) Cyclocross Cup-Finale, Salzburg	NE			

=== 2026 AusCycling National Cyclo-Cross Series ===
Date	Course	Class	Winner	Team	References
23 May 2026	(Australia) 2026 AusCycling CX National Series Round 1, Ascot	NE	Zoe Davison (AUS)		
24 May 2026	(Australia) 2026 AusCycling CX National Series Round 2, Ascot	NE	Zoe Davison (AUS)		
27 June 2026	(Australia) 2026 AusCycling CX National Series Round 3, Canberra	NE	Katherine Hosking (AUS)		
28 June 2026	(Australia) 2026 AusCycling CX National Series Round 4, Canberra	NE	Katherine Hosking (AUS)		
11 July 2026	(Australia) 2026 AusCycling CX National Series Round 5, Walloon	NE	Nina Wright (AUS)		
12 July 2026	(Australia) 2026 AusCycling CX National Series Round 6, Walloon	NE	Nina Wright (AUS)		
16 August 2026	(Australia) 2026 AusCycling CX National Series Round 7, Ballarat	NE	Alicia Reynolds (AUS)		

=== 2026–27 Belgian Concap CX Cup ===
Date	Course	Class	Winner	Team	References
6 September 2026	(Belgium) 2026–27 Belgian Concap CX Cup #1, Kessel	NE	Lentel Huys (BEL)	Team Kempen Cycling vzw	
13 September 2026	(Belgium) 2026–27 Belgian Concap CX Cup #2, Heist-op-den-Berg	NE	Noï Moes (NED)	WV Schijndel	
19 September 2026	(Belgium) 2026–27 Belgian Concap CX Cup #3, Steenhuffel	NE	Joyce Vanderbeken (BEL)	Bike-Advice Cycling Team vzw	
27 September 2026	(Belgium) 2026–27 Belgian Concap CX Cup #4, Gierle	NE	Lentel Huys (BEL)	Team Kempen Cycling vzw	
11 October 2026	(Belgium) 2026–27 Belgian Concap CX Cup #5, Nossegem	NE	Liene Meeusen (BEL)		
17 October 2026	(Belgium) 2026–27 Belgian Concap CX Cup #6, Eversel	NE	Liene Meeusen (BEL)		
25 October 2026	(Belgium) 2026–27 Belgian Concap CX Cup #7, Herenthout	NE	Liene Meeusen (BEL)		
31 October 2026	(Belgium) 2026–27 Belgian Concap CX Cup #8, Fonteinencross, Vilvoorde	NE	Joyce Vanderbeken (BEL)	Bike-Advice Cycling Team vzw	
21 November 2026	(Belgium) 2026–27 Belgian Concap CX Cup #9, Boortmeerbeek	NE			
28 November 2026	(Belgium) 2026–27 Belgian Concap CX Cup #10, Meulebeke	NE			
26 December 2026	(Belgium) 2026–27 Belgian Concap CX Cup #11, Beernem	NE			
30 December 2026	(Belgium) 2026–27 Belgian Concap CX Cup #12, Hamme	NE			
17 January 2027	(Belgium) 2026–27 Belgian Concap CX Cup #13, Bekkevoort	NE			
24 January 2027	(Belgium) 2026–27 Belgian Concap CX Cup #14, Meer	NE			
31 January 2027	(Belgium) 2026–27 Belgian Concap CX Cup #15, Izegem	NE			

=== Campeonato Metropolitano de Ciclocross 2026 ===
Date	Course	Class	Winner	Team	References
7 June 2026	2026 Chile CX Cup 1, Curacaví	NE	María Fernanda Castro (CHI)	Club de Ciclismo Río Cruces	
21 June 2026	2026 Chile CX Cup 2, Peñalolén	NE	María Fernanda Castro (CHI)	Club de Ciclismo Río Cruces	
12 July 2026	2026 Chile CX Cup 3, Maipú	NE	María Fernanda Castro (CHI)	Club de Ciclismo Río Cruces	
26 July 2026	2026 Chile CX Cup 4, San Bernardo	NE	Verena Hörmann (CHI)	Club Social y Deportivo All Cycling Team	
9 August 2026	2026 Chile CX Cup 5, Curacaví	NE	María Fernanda Castro (CHI)	Club de Ciclismo Río Cruces	

=== 2026 Czech Cup (Janev Cup) ===
Date	Course	Class	Winner	Team	References
3 October 2026	(Czech Republic) 2026 Janev Cup #1, Chýnov	C1	Kristýna Zemanová (CZE)	Crelan - Corendon	
17 October 2026	(Czech Republic) 2026 Janev Cup #2, Holé Vrchy	C2	Kristýna Zemanová (CZE)	Crelan - Corendon	
24 October 2026	(Czech Republic) 2026 Janev Cup #3, Rýmařov	C1	Lucia Bramati (ITA)	FAS Airport Services - Guerciotti	
31 October 2026	(Czech Republic) 2026 Janev Cup #4, Hlinsko	C2	Barbora Bukovská (CZE)	Fenix–Premier Tech	
14 November 2026	(Czech Republic) 2026 Janev Cup #5, Jičín	C2	Kateřina Hladíková (CZE)	Brilon Racing Team MB	
17 November 2026	(Czech Republic) 2026 Janev Cup #6, Prachatice	NE			
5 December 2026	(Czech Republic) 2026 Janev Cup #7, Kolín	C2			
12 December 2026	(Czech Republic) 2026 Janev Cup #8, Veselí nad Lužnicí	C1			

=== 2026 Danish Cross-Cup ===
Date	Course	Class	Winner	Team	References
24 October 2026	(Denmark) Copenhagen Cyclo Cross Clash - Day 2, Copenhagen	C2	Part of Copenhagen Cyclo Cross Clash		
1 November 2026	(Denmark) Alflow Cross, Kalundborg	NE	Mathilde Leegaard (DEN)	Dansk Mountainbike Klub	
7 November 2026	(Denmark) Fredericia CC - Cross Cup 3, Fredericia	NE	Ann-Dorthe Lisbygd (DEN)	Dansk Mountainbike Klub	
15 November 2026	(Denmark) Cross-Cup IV - Roskilde, Roskilde	NE			
5 December 2026	(Denmark) Cross-Cup V - Skive Cykle Klub, Skive	NE			
12 December 2026	(Denmark) Cross-Cup VI - Holbæk Sportsby, Holbæk	NE			

=== 2026 Estonian Cup (CX Karikasari) ===
Date	Course	Class	Winner	Team	References
27 September 2026	(Estonia) Haanja CX, Haanja	NE	Evelīna Ermane-Marčenko (LVA)	Orbea NextGen Racing Team	
3 October 2026	(Estonia) Rapla CX, Rapla	NE	Evelīna Ermane-Marčenko (LVA)	Orbea NextGen Racing Team	
10 October 2026	(Estonia) Elva CX, Elva	NE	Marta Mõttus (EST)	Hasnja Rattaklubi	
17 October 2026	(Estonia) CX Tallinn, Tallinn	NE	Ann-Christine Allik (EST)		
24 October 2026	(Estonia) BikeFanatics Rakke CX '26, Rakke	NE	Janika Lõiv (EST)		

=== 2026 Finnish Cup (Suomen Cyclocross Cup) ===
Date	Course	Class	Winner	Team	References
13 September 2026	(Finland) Valkeala Cyclocross, Kouvola	NE	Mette Borremans (FIN)	KorsKa	
20 September 2026	(Finland) Rajamäki CX, Rajamäki	NE	Mette Borremans (FIN)	KorsKa	
27 September 2026	(Finland) CX Olari, Espoo	NE	Mette Borremans (FIN)	KorsKa	
4 October 2026	(Finland) Lieto CX Cup 4., Lieto	NE	Mette Borremans (FIN)	KorsKa	
25 October 2026	(Finland) Tuusula Cyclocross, Tuusula	NE	Mette Borremans (FIN)	KorsKa	
1 November 2026	(Finland) Kivikko Prestige, Helsinki	NE	Hanna Häkkinen (FIN)	Reaktor Stanga Racing	

=== 2026 Coupe de France de cyclo-cross ===
Date	Course	Class	Winner	Team	References
24 October 2026	Coupe de France de cyclo-cross #1, Nommay	C2	Amandine Muller (FRA)	Specialized TMRW	
25 October 2026	Coupe de France de cyclo-cross #2, Nommay	C2	Célia Gery (FRA)	Specialized TMRW	
21 November 2026	Coupe de France de cyclo-cross #3, Issoire	C2			
22 November 2026	Coupe de France de cyclo-cross #4, Issoire	C2			
12 December 2026	Coupe de France de cyclo-cross #5, Saint-Prouant	C2			
13 December 2026	Coupe de France de cyclo-cross #6, Saint-Prouant	C2			

=== 2026–27 German Bundesliga Cyclocross ===
Date	Course	Class	Winner	Team	References
19 September 2026	(Germany) Int. Cyclo-Cross Bad Salzdetfurth #1, Bad Salzdetfurth	C2	Denise Betsema (NED)	De Ceuster Bouwkranen	
20 September 2026	(Germany) Int. Cyclo-Cross Bad Salzdetfurth #2, Bad Salzdetfurth	C2	Denise Betsema (NED)	De Ceuster Bouwkranen	
3 October 2026	(Germany) Bauhaus Perlcross, Perl	C2	Denise Betsema (NED)	De Ceuster Bouwkranen	
4 October 2026	(Germany) Bauhaus Perlcross, Perl	NE	Laura Oiernet (GER)	VCCH	
11 October 2026	(Germany) Rund um den Lohner Aussichtsturm, Lohne	NE	Katharina Julia Hinz (GER)	RSG Hannover	
24 October 2026	(Germany) 6.1 Munich Super Cross, München	NE	Sina van Thiel (GER)		
25 October 2026	(Germany) 6.2 Int. C2 Munich Super Cross, München	C2	Judith Krahl (GER)	ROSE Racing Circle women	
7 November 2026	(Germany) Vaihinger Radcross 2026, Vaihingen an der Enz	NE	Lena Schärtl (GER)	FSV Dornberg 2010	
8 November 2026	(Germany) Magstadter Radcross, Magstadt	NE	Lena Schärtl (GER)	FSV Dornberg 2010	
14 November 2026	(Germany) Cyclo-Cross Bundesliga 2026/2027 Stahnsdorf #1, Stahnsdorf	NE			
15 November 2026	(Germany) Cyclo-Cross Bundesliga 2026/2027 Stahnsdorf #2, Stahnsdorf	NE			
3 January 2027	(Germany) Vechtaer Querfeldeinrennen am Reiterwaldstadion, Vechta	NE			

=== 2026–27 British Cyclo-cross National Trophy ===
Date	Course	Class	Winner	Team	References
17–18 October 2026	(United Kingdom) Cyclo-cross National Trophy #1, Derby	~~C2~~ NE	Zoe Roche (GBR)	camsmajaco	
7–8 November 2026	(United Kingdom) Cyclo-cross National Trophy #2, Pontypool	NE	Anna Patterson (GBR)	IGNITE Race Team	
28–29 November 2026	(United Kingdom) Cyclo-cross National Trophy #3, Gravesend	NE			
19–20 December 2026	(United Kingdom) Cyclo-cross National Trophy #4, Shrewsbury	NE			
23 January 2027	(United Kingdom) Cyclo-cross National Trophy #5, North Ayrshire	NE			
24 January 2027	(United Kingdom) Cyclo-cross National Trophy #6, North Ayrshire	NE			

=== 2026–27 Hungarian Cup (Cyclo-cross Magyar Kupa) ===
Date	Course	Class	Winner	Team	References
11 October 2026	(Hungary) Hungarian Cup #1 and Cyclo-Cross Challenge #1, Budapest	NE	Regina Bruchner (HUN)	GreenZone ZKSE	
24 October 2026	(Hungary) Hungarian Cup #2, Siklós	NE	Adrienn Punk (HUN)	Joyride	
31 October 2026	(Hungary) Hungarian Cup #3 and Cyclo-Cross Challenge #2, Kiskunlacháza	NE	Eniko-Salome Bondor (ROU)	ACS Living Bike	
21 November 2026	(Hungary) Hungarian Cup #4, Debrecen	NE			
5 December 2026	(Hungary) Hungarian Cup #5 and Cyclo-Cross Challenge #3, Etyek	NE			
13 December 2026	(Hungary) Hungarian Cup #6, Vácrátót	NE			

=== 2026–27 Italian Giro delle Regioni Ciclocross ===
Date	Course	Class	Winner	Team	References
27 September 2026	(Italy) 8^ Trofeo CorridoMnia - 1# Campionato Italiano di Società, Corridonia	NE	Angelica Coluccini (ITA)	Jam's Bike Team Buja	
4 October 2026	(Italy) 4° GP Città di Tarvisio - 2# Giro delle Regioni Ciclocross, Tarvisio	C2	Carlotta Borello (ITA)		
11 October 2026	(Italy) CX Rivellino 2026 - 3# Giro delle Regioni Ciclocross, Osoppo	C2	Carlotta Borello (ITA)		
18 October 2026	(Italy) Zoncross Classic - 4# Giro delle Regioni Ciclocross, Sutrio	C2	Carlotta Borello (ITA)		
25 October 2026	(Italy) 5# Giro delle Regioni Ciclocross, Capalbio	NE	Nicole Azzetti (ITA)	Ale CX Team ASD	
20 December 2026	(Italy) GP Valfontanabuona – 6# Giro delle Regioni Ciclocross, San Colombano Certénoli	C2			

=== 2026 Latvian Cup Cyclocross ===
Date	Course	Class	Winner	Team	References
26 September 2026	(Latvia) Latvian Cup #1, Mārupe	NE	Evelīna Ermane-Marčenko (LVA)	Orbea NextGen Racing Team	
4 October 2026	(Latvia) Latvian Cup #2, Salaspils	NE	Linda Elizabete Brilte (LVA)	VeloLifestyle/SmiltenesBJSS	
25 October 2026	(Latvia) Latvian Cup #3, Smiltene	NE	Laura Klismete (LVA)	Wielerclub Onder Ons Parike	
31 October 2026	(Latvia) Latvian Cup #4, Ozolnieki	NE	Laura Klismete (LVA)	Wielerclub Onder Ons Parike	

=== 2026 Lithuania Cup Cyclocross ===
Date	Course	Class	Winner	Team	References
27 September 2026	Lithuania Cup #1, Kėdainiai	NE	Goda Zenevičiūtė (LTU)	Utenos DSC	
4 October 2026	Lithuania Cup #2, Vilnius	NE	Neimantė Laužikaitė (LVA)	Colibri Cycling team	
17 October 2026	Lithuania Cup #3 – VeloCX International CX Race - Day 1, Vilnius	C2	Loes Sels (BEL)		
18 October 2026	Lithuania Cup #4 – VeloCX International CX Race - Day 2, Vilnius	C2	Antonina Białek (POL)	Warszawski Klub Kolarski	

=== 2026 Škoda Cross Cup ===
Date	Course	Class	Winner	Team	References
11 October 2026	(Luxembourg) Škoda Cross Cup #1 – Festival du cyclo-cross à Kayl 2026, Kayl	NE	Sarah Koenig (LUX)	CT Atertdaul	
17 October 2026	(Luxembourg) Škoda Cross Cup #2 – Urban Nightcross – Memorial Claude Michely, Kayl	NE	Elena Lopes (LUX)	CT Atertdaul	
18 October 2026	(Luxembourg) Škoda Cross Cup #3 – Grand Prix Gemeng Munnerëf, Mondorf-les-Bains	NE	Sarah Koenig (LUX)	CT Atertdaul	
25 October 2026	(Luxembourg) Škoda Cross Cup #4 – ACC Contern, Contern	C2	Marie Schreiber (LUX)	Team SD Worx–Protime	
22 November 2026	(Luxembourg) Škoda Cross Cup #5 – SaF Zéisseng, Cessange	NE			
29 November 2026	(Luxembourg) Škoda Cross Cup #6 – LP 07 Schifflange, Schifflange	NE			
6 December 2026	(Luxembourg) Škoda Cross Cup #7 – VV Tooltime, Préizerdaul	NE			
13 December 2026	(Luxembourg) Škoda Cross Cup #8 – UCN Ettelbruck, Ettelbruck	NE			
26 December 2026	(Luxembourg) Škoda Cross Cup #9 – CCI Differdange, Differdange	NE			
1 January 2027	(Luxembourg) Škoda Cross Cup #10 – Grand Prix du Nouvel an Pétange, Pétange	C2			
3 January 2027	(Luxembourg) Škoda Cross Cup #11 – LG Alzingen, Alzingen	NE			
16 January 2027	(Luxembourg) Škoda Cross Cup #12 – Grand-Prix de l'Armée Diekirch, Diekirch	C2			
17 January 2027	(Luxembourg) Škoda Cross Cup #13 – VC Diekirch, Diekirch	NE			

=== 2026 Netherlands National Cup ===
Date	Course	Class	Winner	Team	References
27 September 2026	(Netherlands) Kleeberg Cross weekend Day 2, Mechelen	C2	Marie Schreiber (LUX)	Team SD Worx–Protime	
27 September 2026	(Netherlands) Kleeberg Cross weekend Day 2, Juniors, Mechelen	C2	Maxime Takken (NED)	CC Pavé 76	
3–4 October 2026	(Netherlands) NL Cup: Nationale & Jeugdveldrit Norg, Norg	NE	Anniek Mos (NED)	KDM-Pack Cycling Team	
3–4 October 2026	(Netherlands) NL Cup: Nationale & Jeugdveldrit Norg, Juniors, Norg	NE	Lotte Bouman (NED)	WSV de Peddelaars	
10 October 2026	(Netherlands) NL Cup: 12e Nationale Veldrit van Rhenen, Rhenen	NE	Pem Hoefmans (NED)	WV Breda	
10 October 2026	(Netherlands) NL Cup: 12e Nationale Veldrit van Rhenen, Juniors, Rhenen	NE	Hannah van Rijswijk (NED)	WV Schijndel	
18 October 2026	(Netherlands) Rolande GP Oisterwijk, Oisterwijk	NE	Noï Moes (NED)	WV Schijndel	
20 October 2026	(Netherlands) 26e Nacht van Woerden, Woerden	C2	Marie Schreiber (LUX)	Team SD Worx–Protime	
24 October 2026	(Netherlands) Internationale Cyclocross Heerderstrand, Heerde	C2	Part of HG Cross Series		
1 November 2026	(Netherlands) Nationale Veldrit Almelo 15+, Almelo	NE	Sera Gademan (NED)	R en TV de Zwaluwen	
15 November 2026	(Netherlands) Vam-Berg Cross Wijster, Wijster	C2			
21 November 2026	(Netherlands) NL Cup: Janet Memorial Veldrit van Hilversum, Hilversum	NE			
29 November 2026	(Netherlands) NL Cup: De bultcross Leiden - Day 2, Leiden	NE			

=== 2026 New Zealand Southern Cross Series ===
Date	Course	Class	Winner	Team	References
3 May 2026	(New Zealand) 2026 Southern Cross Series Round 1, Christchurch	NE	Maria Laurie (NZL)		
24 May 2026	(New Zealand) 2026 Southern Cross Series Round 2, Christchurch	NE	Millie Junge (NZL)		
14 June 2026	(New Zealand) 2026 Southern Cross Series Round 3, Christchurch	NE	Maria Laurie (NZL)		
28 June 2026	(New Zealand) 2026 Southern Cross Series Round 4, Christchurch	NE	Annabel Bligh (NZL)		
26 July 2026	(New Zealand) 2026 Southern Cross Series Round 5, Christchurch	NE	Annabel Bligh (NZL)		
16 August 2026	(New Zealand) 2026 Southern Cross Series Round 6, Christchurch	NE	Annabel Bligh (NZL)		

=== 2026 Polish Cup ===
Date	Course	Class	Winner	Team	—	References
10 October 2026	(Poland) Puchar Polski #1, Kielce	NE	Zuzanna Krzystała (POL)	Pho3nix Cycling Team		
18 October 2026	(Poland) Puchar Polski #2, Kluczbork	NE	Zuzanna Krzystała (POL)	Pho3nix Cycling Team		
24 October 2026	(Poland) B Class, Słubice	NE	Larissa Luttuschka (GER)		Not part of Polish Cup	
25 October 2026	(Poland) Puchar Polski #3, Słubice	NE	Natalia Jaros (POL)	LKS POM Strzelce Krajeńskie		
7 November 2026	(Poland) Puchar Polski #4, Piaseczno	NE	Antonina Białek (POL)	Warszawski Klub Kolarski		
8 November 2026	(Poland) Puchar Polski #5, Szczekociny	NE	Zuzanna Krzystała (POL)	Pho3nix Cycling Team		
11 November 2026	(Poland) Puchar Polski #6, Koziegłowy	NE	Zuzanna Krzystała (POL)	Pho3nix Cycling Team		
21 November 2026	(Poland) Puchar Polski #7, Koźminek	NE				
28 November 2026	(Poland) B Class, Turawa	NE				
29 November 2026	(Poland) Puchar Polski #8, Środa Wielkopolska	NE				
13 December 2026	(Poland) Puchar Polski #9, Środa Wielkopolska	NE				
19 December 2026	(Poland) B Class, Załuski	NE				
20 December 2026	(Poland) Puchar Polski #10, Załuski	NE				

=== 2026 Portugal Cup (Taça de Portugal Ciclocrosse) ===
Date	Course	Class	Winner	Team	References
17 October 2026	1ª Taça de Portugal Ciclocrosse, Marco de Canaveses	NE	Ana Santos (POR)	Cannondale Factory Racing	
18 October 2026	2ª Taça de Portugal Ciclocrosse, Santo Tirso	C2	Ana Santos (POR)	Cannondale Factory Racing	
24 October 2026	3ª Taça de Portugal Ciclocrosse, Vouzela	C2	Ana Santos (POR)	Cannondale Factory Racing	
25 October 2026	4ª Taça de Portugal Ciclocrosse, Vila Real	C2	Ana Santos (POR)	Cannondale Factory Racing	
5 December 2026	5ª Taça de Portugal Ciclocrosse, Vale de Cambra	NE			
6 December 2026	6ª Taça de Portugal Ciclocrosse, TBD	NE			

=== 2026 Romanian Cup (Cupa României) ===
Date	Course	Class	Winner	Team	References
24–25 October 2026	(Romania) Velocrosul Castanilor and Balcan Championship, Florești	NE	Eniko-Salome Stan (ROU)	ACS Living Bike	
13–15 November 2026	(Romania) Vatra Dornei CX Cup, Vatra Dornei	NE			
5 December 2026	(Romania) Cluj Winter Race, Cluj-Napoca	NE			
12 December 2026	(Romania) MTB Academy CX Cup, Bucharest	NE			

=== 2026 Slovak Cup (NoLimited Cup) ===
Date	Course	Class	Winner	Team	References
27 September 2026	(Slovakia) NoLimited Cup #1, Levoča	C2	Tereza Tvarůžková (CZE)		
11 October 2026	(Slovakia) NoLimited Cup #2, Podbrezová	C2	Kateřina Douděrová (CZE)	TJ Auto Škoda MB	
18 October 2026	(Slovakia) NoLimited Cup #3, Trnava	C2	Nadja Heigl (AUT)		
24 October 2026	(Slovakia) NoLimited Cup #4, Topoľčianky	C2	Nadja Heigl (AUT)		
25 October 2026	(Slovakia) NoLimited Cup #5, Topoľčianky	C2	Lucia Bramati (ITA)	FAS Airport Services - Guerciotti	
8 November 2026	(Slovakia) NoLimited Cup #6, Sereď	NE	Sofia Ungerová (SVK)	MAT Atom Deweloper Wrocław	
21 November 2026	(Slovakia) NoLimited Cup #7, Šamorín	C1			
22 November 2026	(Slovakia) NoLimited Cup #8, Šamorín	C2			
5 December 2026	(Slovakia) NoLimited Cup #9, Selce	NE	Part of National Championships		
6 December 2026	(Slovakia) NoLimited Cup #10, Selce	C2			

=== 2026 Slovenian Cup (Pokala Slovenije v ciklokrosu) ===
Date	Course	Class	Winner	Team	References
29 November 2026	(Slovenia) Slovenian Cup #1, Vrhnika	NE			
6 December 2026	(Slovenia) Slovenian Cup #2, Polzela	NE			
13 December 2026	(Slovenia) Slovenian Cup #3, Murska Sobota	NE			
26 December 2026	(Slovenia) Slovenian Cup #4, Ljubljana	NE			
29 December 2026	(Slovenia) Slovenian Cup #5, Municipality of Straža	NE	Part of National Championships		

=== 2026 Copa de España de Ciclocross ===
Date	Course	Class	Winner	Team	References
4 October 2026	(Spain) Copa de España de Ciclo-cross #1 - Gran Premio Ayuntamiento de Siero, Siero	C2	Sofia Rodríguez (ESP)	Nesta - MMR CX Team	
11 October 2026	(Spain) Copa de España de Ciclo-cross #2 - Ciclocross Internacional Xaxancx - Ence, Marín	C2	Alexandra Valade (FRA)	VCESQY Team Voussert	
31 October 2026	(Spain) Copa de España #3 - Amurrioko Ziklokrossa, Amurrio	C2	Sofia Rodríguez (ESP)	Nesta - MMR CX Team	
14 November 2026	(Spain) Copa de España de Ciclo-cross #4 - G.P KH7, Les Franqueses del Vallès	C1	Alexandra Valade (FRA)	VCESQY Team Voussert	
5 December 2026	(Spain) Copa de España de Ciclo-cross #5 - XI Ciclocross Internacional Ciutat de Xàtiva, Xàtiva	C2			
6 December 2026	(Spain) Copa de España de Ciclo-cross #6 - IV Trofeo Ciclo-Cross Rafa Valls - Fira Tots Sants, Cocentaina	C2			

=== 2026 Swedish Cup (SWE Cup) ===
Date	Course	Class	Winner	Team	References
10 October 2026	(Sweden) Stockholm Cyclocross Weekend Day 1, Stockholm	C2	Xan Crees (GBR)		
11 October 2026	(Sweden) Stockholm Cyclocross Weekend Day 1, Stockholm	C2	Xan Crees (GBR)		
17 October 2026	(Sweden) Varberg Cyclocross Day 1, Varberg	NE	Oda Laforce (NOR)		
18 October 2026	(Sweden) Varberg Cyclocross Day 2, Varberg	NE	Oda Laforce (NOR)		

=== 2026 Swiss Cyclocross Cup ===
Date	Course	Class	Winner	Team	References
11 October 2026	(Switzerland) Swiss Cyclocross Cup #1 – Radquer Steinmaur, Steinmaur	C2	Lison Desprez (FRA)	AS Bike Racing - France Literie	
18 October 2026	(Switzerland) Swiss Cyclocross Cup #2 – AlperoseQuer Schneisingen, Schneisingen	C2	Lison Desprez (FRA)	AS Bike Racing - France Literie	
25 October 2026	(Switzerland) Swiss Cyclocross Cup #3 – Radquer Mettmenstetten, Mettmenstetten	C2	Rebekka Estermann (SUI)		
22 November 2026	(Switzerland) Swiss Cyclocross Cup #4 – Radquer Hittnau, Hittnau	C2			

=== 2026 USCX series ===
Date	Course	Class	Winner	Team	References
19 September 2026	(United States) Trek USCX #1 - Rochester Cyclocross, Rochester	C1	Manon Bakker (NED)		
20 September 2026	(United States) Trek USCX #2 - Rochester Cyclocross, Rochester	C2	Manon Bakker (NED)		
26 September 2026	(United States) Trek USCX #3 - Virginia's Blue Ridge Go Cross, Roanoke	C1	Manon Bakker (NED)		
27 September 2026	(United States) Trek USCX #4 - Virginia's Blue Ridge Go Cross, Roanoke	C2	Sidney McGill (CAN)		
3 October 2026	(United States) Trek USCX #5 - Charm City Cross, Baltimore	C1	Manon Bakker (NED)		
4 October 2026	(United States) Trek USCX #6 - Charm City Cross, Baltimore	C2	Manon Bakker (NED)		

== Regional National Cups Women's Elite ==
=== France ===
==== Auvergne-Rhône-Alpes ====
===== Ain =====
Date	Course	Class	Winner	Team	References
26 September 2026	(France) Cyclo-cross de Neuville-les-Dames, Neuville-les-Dames	NE	Célia Mathelin (FRA)	Vélo Club Roannais	
3 October 2026	(France) Cyclo-cross de Cormoz, Cormoz	NE	Flavie Monier Guyon (FRA)	Guidon Bletteranois	
18 October 2026	(France) Cyclo Cross d’Arbent, Arbent	NE	Cancelled		
25 October 2026	(France) Cyclo-Cross de Treffort, Val-Revermont	NE	Jeanne Joblot (FRA)	VTT Conliège Jura Bassin de Lons-le-Saunier	

===== Allier =====
Date	Course	Class	Winner	Team	References
3 October 2026	(France) Cyclo-Cross du complexe sportif Roger Walkowiak, Cusset	NE	Célia Mathelin (FRA)	Vélo Club Roannais	
25 October 2026	(France) Cyclo-cross de Désertines, Désertines	NE	Carole Royet Vialle (FRA)	ASPTT Clermont	
1 November 2026	(France) Cyclo-Cross des Champins de la Moulins, Moulins	NE	Célia Thurel (FRA)	EC Bourbonnien	
8 November 2026	(France) Cyclo-cross des Ozières, Yzeure	NE	Maëlle Martin (FRA)	Albi Vélo Sport	

===== Drôme =====
Date	Course	Class	Winner	Team	References
27 September 2026	(France) Cyclo-cross de Pierrelatte, Pierrelatte	NE	Séverine Corret (FRA)	Natur'Bike Pierrevert	
10 October 2026	(France) Cyclo-cross de Saint-Rambert-d'Albon, Saint-Rambert-d'Albon	NE	Eve Richiardi (FRA)	AS Fontaine	
18 October 2026	(France) Cyclo-Cross d’Andancette, Andancette	NE	Eve Richiardi (FRA)	AS Fontaine	
25 October 2026	(France) Cyclo-Cross de Bren, Bren	NE	Louison Mélèze (FRA)	Sud Grésivaudan Cyclisme Compétition	
1 November 2026	(France) Cyclo-cross de Valence, Valence	NE	Évita Muzic (FRA)	FDJ United–Suez	
11 November 2026	(France) Cyclo-cross de Saint-Sorlin-en-Valloire, Saint-Sorlin-en-Valloire	NE	Anaïs Guillet (FRA)	V.C. Rhodanien	

===== Isère =====
Date	Course	Class	Winner	Team	References
13 September 2026	(France) Cyclo-cross de Pont-de-Chéruy, Pont-de-Chéruy	NE	Anaïs Martinet (FRA)	Chambéry Cyclisme Compétition	
19 September 2026	(France) Cyclo-Cross de Chavanoz, Chavanoz	NE	Amandine Vidon (FRA)	Vélo Club d'Ambérieu	
4 October 2026	(France) Cyclo-cross de Montferrat, Montferrat	NE	Amandine Vidon (FRA)	Vélo Club d'Ambérieu	
11 October 2026	(France) Cyclo-cross de Rives, Rives	NE	Rose Dupont (FRA)	VC Villefranche Beaujolais	
1 November 2026	(France) Cyclo-Cross du GAEC du Gua, Fitilieu	NE	Elaïs Dell'Orto (FRA)	Evian Velo	
7 November 2026	(France) Cyclo-cross de Saint-Quentin-Fallavier, Saint-Quentin-Fallavier	NE	Louane Famy (FRA)	Jura Cyclisme Pays du Revermont	
14 November 2026	(France) Cyclo-cross de Fontaine, Fontaine	NE	Évita Muzic (FRA)	FDJ United–Suez	

===== Loire =====
Date	Course	Class	Winner	Team	References
25 October 2026	(France) Cyclo-cross de Firminy, Firminy	NE	Juliette Fogeron (FRA)	VC Rambertois	
1 November 2026	(France) Cyclo-Cross de Saint-Jean-Bonnefonds, Saint-Jean-Bonnefonds	NE	Anna Blanchet (FRA)	VS Romanais Péageois	
8 November 2026	(France) Cyclo-Cross de Montbrison, Montbrison	NE	No Entries		
11 November 2026	(France) Cyclo-cross de Belmont-de-la-Loire, Belmont-de-la-Loire	NE	Marie Moissonnier (FRA)	UVCA Troyes	
15 November 2026	(France) Cyclo-cross de Saint-Galmier, Saint-Galmier	NE	Célia Mathelin (FRA)	Team Praz-sur-Arly	

===== Haute-Loire =====
Date	Course	Class	Winner	Team	References
31 October 2026	(France) Cyclocross de Brioude, Brioude	NE	Jade Tarrisse (FRA)	XC63	

===== Puy-de-Dôme =====
Date	Course	Class	Winner	Team	References
4 October 2026	(France) Cyclo-cross d'Ambert, Ambert	NE	Oriane Chadefaux (FRA)	Issoire Cyclisme	
18 October 2026	(France) Cyclo-Cross de Perrier, Perrier	NE	Cancelled		
7 November 2026	(France) Cyclo-cross de Romagnat, Romagnat	NE	Jade Tarrisse (FRA)	XC63	
14 November 2026	(France) Cyclo-cross de Cournon – Trophée Groupama, Cournon-d'Auvergne	NE	Jade Tarrisse (FRA)	XC63	

===== Rhône Métropole de Lyon =====
Date	Course	Class	Winner	Team	References
18 October 2026	(France) Cyclo-Cross des Mûriers, Saint-Laurent-de-Mure	NE	Enora Laurent (FRA)	Club Viennois d'Animat CY	
31 October 2026	(France) Cyclo-cross de Meyzieu, Meyzieu	NE	Maryne Guilbot (FRA)	UCC Vivonne	
1 November 2026	(France) Cyclo-Cross de Belleville, Belleville	NE	Anna Blanchet (FRA)	VS Romanais Péageois	
8 November 2026	(France) Cyclo-Cross de Saint-Martin-en-Haut, Saint-Martin-en-Haut	NE	Nikki Dewaele (FRA)	VS Romanais Péageois	
15 November 2026	(France) Cyclo-cross d'Anse, Anse	NE	Évita Muzic (FRA)	FDJ United–Suez	

===== Savoie =====
Date	Course	Class	Winner	Team	References
17 October 2026	(France) Cyclo-Cross de La Motte-Servolex, La Motte-Servolex	NE	Anna Blanchet (FRA)	VS Romanais Péageois	

===== Haute-Savoie =====
Date	Course	Class	Winner	Team	References
4 October 2026	(France) Cyclo-cross de Samoëns, Samoëns	NE	Elaïs Dell'Orto (FRA)	Evian Vélo	
17 October 2026	(France) Cyclo-Cross de Passy – Jour 1, Passy	NE	Mathilde Tritz (FRA)	CS Chamonix VTT	
18 October 2026	(France) Cyclo-Cross de Passy – Jour 2, Passy	NE	Mathilde Tritz (FRA)	CS Chamonix VTT	
24 October 2026	(France) Cyclo Cross Nocturne de Villaz, Villaz	NE	Elaïs Dell'Orto (FRA)	Evian Velo	

==== Bourgogne-Franche-Comté ====
Date	Course	Class	Winner	Team	References
2–3 January 2027	(France) Championnat régional Bourgogne Franche-Comté, Dijon	NE			

===== Doubs =====
Date	Course	Class	Winner	Team	References
20 September 2026	(France) Cyclo-cross de Pontarlier, Pontarlier	NE	Cancelled		
26 September 2026	(France) Cyclo-cross du Val de Morteau, Val de Morteau	NE	Romane Reynier (FRA)	UVCA Troyes	
11 October 2026	(France) Cyclo-cross de Montbéliard, Montbéliard	NE	Pauline Leherle (FRA)	V.C. de Montbéliard	
18 October 2026	(France) Cyclo-cross de Pont de Roide Vermondans, Pont-de-Roide-Vermondans	NE	Pauline Leherle (FRA)	V.C. de Montbéliard	
1 November 2026	(France) Cyclo-Cross de Geneuille, Geneuille	NE	Marlène Morel-Petitgirard (FRA)	VC Ornans	
7 November 2026	(France) Cyclo-cross d'Arçon, Arçon	NE	Cancelled		
7 November 2026	(France) Cyclo-cross Morteau II, Val de Morteau	NE	Émilie Petithory (FRA)	CC Étupes Le Doubs Pays de Montbéliard	
21 November 2026	(France) Cyclo-cross de Maiche, Maîche	NE			
27 December 2026	(France) Cyclo-cross de Valdahon, Valdahon	NE			
17 January 2027	(France) Cyclo cross d'Ornans, Ornans	NE			

===== Jura =====
Date	Course	Class	Winner	Team	References
27 September 2026	(France) Cyclo-cross de Quintigny, Quintigny	NE	Augustine Dard (FRA)	VC Morteau-Montbenoît	
8 November 2026	(France) Cyclo-cross de Lons-le-Saunier, Lons-le-Saunier	NE	Nolwenn Vaxillaire (FRA)	VC Dolois	
14 November 2026	(France) Cyclo-cross de Vers en Montagne - Souvenir René Jacques, Vers-en-Montagne	NE	Amandine Angonnet (FRA)	Jura Cyclisme Fem	
15 November 2026	(France) Cyclo-cross de Dole - Crissey, Crissey	NE	Méline Pochard (FRA)	VC Ornans	
5 December 2026	(France) Cyclo-cross d'Arbois, Arbois	NE			
6 December 2026	(France) Cyclo-cross Val d'Amour - Mont/Vaudrey, Bans	NE			
13 December 2026	(France) Cyclo-cross de Ruffey-Desnes, Desnes	NE			

===== Nièvre =====
Date	Course	Class	Winner	Team	References
4 October 2026	(France) Cyclo-cross de Mesves/Loire, Mesves-sur-Loire	NE	No Information		
11 October 2026	(France) Cyclo-cross d'Alluy, Alluy	NE	Floriane Bertin (FRA)	VS Nivernais Morvan	
18 October 2026	(France) Cyclo-cross Saint Eloi, Saint-Éloi	NE	No Information		
25 October 2026	(France) CX Niffond, Varennes-Vauzelles	NE	Isabelle Faria da Costa (FRA)	CC Varennes-Vauzelles	
8 November 2026	(France) Cyclo-cross de Châtillon-en-Bazois, Châtillon-en-Bazois	NE	Cancelled		
8 November 2026	(France) Cyclo-cross de Coulanges-lès-Nevers, Coulanges-lès-Nevers	NE	Fanny Tillier (FRA)	CC Varennes-Vauzelles	
15 November 2026	(France) Cyclo-cross de Magny Cours, Magny-Cours	NE	Fanny Tillier (FRA)	CC Varennes-Vauzelles	
22 November 2026	(France) Cyclo-cross de Château-Chinon, Château-Chinon (Ville)	NE			
29 November 2026	(France) Cyclo-cross de Chaulgnes, Chaulgnes	NE			
5 December 2026	(France) Cyclo-cross de la Municipalité de Garchizy, Garchizy	NE			
6 December 2026	(France) Prix de la Municipalité – Souvenir Jean-Luc Vernisse, Nevers	NE			

===== Haute-Saône =====
Date	Course	Class	Winner	Team	References
4 October 2026	(France) Cyclo-cross de la CAV, Vaivre-et-Montoille	NE	Pauline Leherle (FRA)	V.C. de Montbéliard	
8 November 2026	(France) Cyclo-cross de Mélisey, Mélisey	NE	Romane Reynier (FRA)	UVCA Troyes	
29 November 2026	(France) Cyclo-cross de Rioz, Rioz	NE			

===== Saône-et-Loire =====
Date	Course	Class	Winner	Team	References
17 October 2026	(France) Cyclo-cross de Chalon-sur-Saône, Chalon-sur-Saône	NE	Cancelled		
18 October 2026	(France) Cyclo-cross de Mâcon, Mâcon	NE	No Elite due to the lack of participants		
11 November 2026	(France) Cyclo-cross de Bourbon Lancy, Bourbon-Lancy	NE	Nolwenn Vaxillaire (FRA)	VC Dolois	
29 November 2026	(France) Cyclo-cross du Creusot, Le Creusot	NE			

===== Territoire de Belfort =====
Date	Course	Class	Winner	Team	References
25 October 2026	(France) Cyclo-cross de Belfort, Belfort	NE	Cancelled		
11 November 2026	(France) Cyclo-cross Belfort Citadelle, Belfort	NE	Pauline Leherle (FRA)	V.C. de Montbéliard	
6 December 2026	(France) Cyclo-cross du Malsaucy, Sermamagny	NE			
19 December 2026	(France) Cyclo-cross de la Douce à Belfort, Belfort	NE			
20 December 2026	(France) Cyclo-cross Souvenir Roland Canal, Belfort	NE			

===== Yonne =====
Date	Course	Class	Winner	Team	References
25 October 2026	(France) Cyclocross du VCA, Auxerre	NE	Cancelled		
31 October 2026	(France) Cyclo-cross de Puisaye, Saint-Sauveur-en-Puisaye	NE	Célia Thurel (FRA)	EC Bourbonnien	
1 November 2026	(France) Cyclo-cross de Soucy, Soucy	NE	Eva Bibard (FRA)	US Nemours Saint-Pierre	
11 November 2026	(France) Cyclo-cross d'Auxerre, Auxerre	NE	Eva Bibard (FRA)	US Nemours Saint-Pierre	
29 November 2026	(France) Cyclo-cross d'Auxerre, Auxerre	NE			
6 December 2026	(France) Cyclo-cross d'Escamps – Championnat 89, Escamps	NE			
13 December 2026	(France) Cyclo-cross d'Appoigny, Appoigny	NE			
13 December 2026	(France) Cyclo-cross d'Auxerre, Auxerre	NE			

==== Brittany ====
===== 2026 Challenge des Sous-Bois Cre'actuel =====
Date	Course	Class	Winner	Team	References
27 September 2026	(France) Challenge des Sous-Bois Cre'actuel #1, Argentré-du-Plessis	NE	Alizée Rigaux (FRA)	Team Sprint Energy	
4 October 2026	(France) Challenge des Sous-Bois Cre'actuel #2, Domloup	NE	Alizée Rigaux (FRA)	Team Sprint Energy	
11 October 2026	(France) Challenge des Sous-Bois Cre'actuel #3, Dol-de-Bretagne	NE	Alizée Rigaux (FRA)	Team Sprint Energy	
25 October 2026	(France) Challenge des Sous-Bois Cre'actuel #4, Pleudihen-sur-Rance	NE			
11 November 2026	(France) Challenge des Sous-Bois Cre'actuel #5, Saint-Jacques-de-la-Lande	NE			
13 December 2026	(France) Challenge des Sous-Bois Cre'actuel #6, Saint-Congard	NE			
17 January 2027	(France) Challenge des Sous-Bois Cre'actuel #7 (Finals), Iffendic	NE			

===== 2026 Challenge de Cornouaille Sud =====
Date	Course	Class	Winner	Team	References
4 October 2026	(France) Challenge de Cornouaille Sud #1, Quimper	NE	Enora Aveline (FRA)	AC Lanester 56	
25 October 2026	(France) Challenge de Cornouaille Sud #2, Quimperlé	NE			
1 November 2026	(France) Challenge de Cornouaille Sud #3, Ergué-Gabéric	NE			
7–8 November 2026	(France) Challenge de Cornouaille Sud #4, Scaër	NE			
15 November 2026	(France) Challenge de Cornouaille Sud #5, Mellac	NE			
20 December 2026	(France) Challenge de Cornouaille Sud #6, Trégunc	NE			

===== 2026 Coupe de Bretagne =====
Date	Course	Class	Winner	Team	References
17 October 2026	(France) Coupe de Bretagne #1, Plouaret	NE			
18 October 2026	(France) Coupe de Bretagne #2, Trévé	NE			
8 November 2026	(France) Coupe de Bretagne #3, Scaër	NE			
2 January 2027	(France) Coupe de Bretagne #4, Camors	NE			
17 January 2027	(France) Coupe de Bretagne #5 (Finals), Iffendic	NE			

===== 2026 Challenge du Bout du Monde CX =====
Date	Course	Class	Winner	Team	References
3 October 2026	(France) Cyclo-cross du Kan, Pleyber-Christ	NE	Gwladys Leray (FRA)	Team XC du Léguer	
11 October 2026	(France) Cyclo-cross de Ménéham à Kerlouan, Kerlouan	NE	Enora Aveline (FRA)	AC Lanester 56	
31 October 2026	(France) Cyclo-cross de Pencran, Pencran	NE			
22 November 2026	(France) Cyclo-cross des 3 Moutons, Lampaul-Ploudalmézeau	NE			

===== 2026 Coupe du Conseil du Morbihan de cyclo-cross =====
Date	Course	Class	Winner	Team	References
10 October 2026	(France) Cyclo-cross de Saint-Guyomard, Saint-Guyomard	NE	Alizée Rigaux (FRA)	Team Sprint Energy	
25 October 2026	(France) Cyclo-cross de Questembert, Questembert	NE			
11 November 2026	(France) Cyclo-cross de Cranne en Baud, Baud	NE			
22 November 2026	(France) Cyclo-cross de Brandivy, Brandivy	NE			
13 December 2026	(France) Cyclo-cross de Séglien, Séglien	NE			
27 December 2026	(France) Cyclo-cross de La Chapelle-Neuve, La Chapelle-Neuve	NE			

===== 2026–27 Challenge de la Petite Mer de cyclo-cross =====
Date	Course	Class	Winner	Team	References
11 October 2026	(France) Américan Cross Santa Anna, Sainte-Anne-d'Auray	NE	No Elite here		
25 October 2026	(France) Cyclo-cross de Questembert, Questembert	NE			
11 November 2026	(France) Cyclo-cross de Cranne en Baud, Baud	NE			
15 November 2026	(France) Cyclo-cross de Locminé, Locminé	NE			
22 November 2026	(France) Cyclo-cross de Brandivy, Brandivy	NE			
13 December 2026	(France) Cyclo-cross de Séglien, Séglien	NE			
3 January 2026	(France) Cyclo-cross de Grand-Champ – Souvenir Didier Le Prévost, Grand-Champ	NE			
17 January 2027	(France) Cyclo-Cross de Auray, Auray	NE			

===== 2026–27 Challenge 22 de cyclo-cross =====
Date	Course	Class	Winner	Team	References
14 November 2026	(France) Challenge 22 de cyclo-cross #1, Rostrenen	NE			
13 December 2026	(France) Challenge 22 de cyclo-cross #2, Lantic	NE			
19 December 2026	(France) Challenge 22 de cyclo-cross #3, Lannion	NE			

===== 2026–27 Regional Championships =====
====== Departament Côtes-d'Armor ======
Date	Course	Class	Winner	Team	References
29 November 2026	(France) Regional Championships Côtes-d'Armor, Corseul	NE			

====== Departament Finistère ======
Date	Course	Class	Winner	Team	References
29 November 2026	(France) Regional Championships Finistère, Le Drennec	NE			

====== Departament Ille-et-Vilaine ======
Date	Course	Class	Winner	Team	References
29 November 2026	(France) Regional Championships Ille-et-Vilaine, Cesson-Sévigné	NE			

====== Departament Morbihan ======
Date	Course	Class	Winner	Team	References
29 November 2026	(France) Regional Championships Morbihan, Gourin	NE			

====== 2026 Regional Bretagne Championships ======
Date	Course	Class	Winner	Team	References
5–6 December 2026	(France) Regional Bretagne Championships, Verne	NE			

Date	Course	Class	Winner	Team	References
10 October 2026	(France) Cyclo-Cross de Coray, Coray	NE	Cancelled		
24 October 2026	(France) Cyclo-Cross de Châteauneuf-du-Faou, Châteauneuf-du-Faou	NE	Cancelled		
11 November 2026	(France) Cyclo-Cross de Plonéour-Lanvern, Plonéour-Lanvern	NE			
19 December 2026	(France) Cyclocross de Lannion-Brélévenez, Lannion	NE			
24 January 2027	(France) Américan Cross Pacé, Pacé	NE	No Elite here		

==== Grand Est ====
===== Coupe Grand Est de Cyclo Cross 2026 =====
Date	Course	Class	Winner	Team	References
3 October 2026	(France) Brumath Bike Festival, Brumath	C2	Denise Betsema (NED)	De Ceuster Bouwkranen	
15 November 2026	(France) Cyclo-Cross Metz Bellecroix, Metz	NE			
6 December 2026	(France) Cyclo cross de Sécheval, Sécheval	NE			

Date	Course	Class	Winner	Team	References
20 September 2026	(France) Cyclo-Cross de Ste Marguerite, Sainte-Marguerite	NE	Cancelled		
20 September 2026	(France) Cyclo-Cross de Tagolsheim, Tagolsheim	NE	Romane Reynier (FRA)	UVCA Troyes	
26 September 2026	(France) Cyclo-cross de la Mauselaine, Gérardmer	NE	Jeanne Duterne (FRA)	Club Remiremont VTT	
27 September 2026	(France) Cyclo-Cross de Vittel, Vittel	NE	Cancelled		
27 September 2026	(France) Cyclo Cross de Bischwiller, Bischwiller	NE	Coralie Rehm (FRA)	AC Bischwiller	
27 September 2026	(France) Cyclo-cross de Boulzicourt, Boulzicourt	NE	Cancelled		
3 October 2026	(France) Brumath Bike Festival REG U19 et +, Brumath	NE	Lucile Bruyère Joumard (FRA)	A.S. Fontaine Cyclisme	
4 October 2026	(France) Cyclo-cross de Bayel, Bayel	NE	Cancelled		
11 October 2026	(France) Cyclo-Cross d'Uxegney, Uxegney	NE	Océane Demange (FRA)	CSM Puteaux	
11 October 2026	(France) Cyclo-cross de Pfastatt-Luttenbach, Lutterbach	NE	Cancelled		
18 October 2026	(France) Cyclo-cross de la Ville de Jarny, Jarny	NE	Morgane Roncolato (FRA)	US Thierville	
18 October 2026	(France) Cyclo-Cross de St Bernard, Saint-Bernard	NE	Romane Reynier (FRA)	UVCA Troyes	
18 October 2026	(France) CC de Saulxures sur Moselotte, Saulxures-sur-Moselotte	NE	Jeanne Duterne (FRA)	Remirevont VTT	
24 October 2026	(France) Cyclo-cross d'Hettange Grande, Hettange-Grande	NE			
25 October 2026	(France) Cyclo cross de Neuves Maisons, Neuves-Maisons	NE			
25 October 2026	(France) Cyclo-cross de Nouvion-sur-Meuse, Nouvion-sur-Meuse	NE			

==== Normandy ====
===== 2026–27 Coupe de Normandie =====
Date	Course	Class	Winner	Team	References
11 October 2026	(France) Coupe de Normandie #1 - Souvenir Yves Libor, Martinvast	NE			

===== 2026–27 Challenge Eric Duchemin Assurances =====
Date	Course	Class	Winner	Team	References
20 September 2026	(France) Challenge Eric Duchemin Assurances #1, Valognes	NE	Pauline Bramoullé (FRA)	UC Alençon Damigny	
1 November 2026	(France) Challenge Eric Duchemin Assurances #2, Portbail	NE			
27 December 2026	(France) Challenge Eric Duchemin Assurances #3, Pirou	NE			

Date	Course	Class	Winner	Team	References
27 September 2026	(France) Cyclo-cross de Saint-Hilaire-du-Harcouët, Saint-Hilaire-du-Harcouët	NE	Cancelled		
4 October 2026	(France) Cyclo-cross Souvenir Daniel-Hardy, La Ferté Macé	NE	Hugoline Roger (FRA)	Briouze Cyclisme Compétition	
18 October 2026	(France) Cyclo-cross de Saint-Bômer-les-Forges, Saint-Bômer-les-Forges	NE			

==== Nouvelle-Aquitaine ====
Date	Course	Class	Winner	Team	References
4 October 2026	(France) Cyclo-cross Saint-Martin-de-Seignanx, Saint-Martin-de-Seignanx	NE	Lola Lisabois (FRA)	VC Métropolitain	

===== 2026 Trophées Cyclo-cross de la Vienne =====
Date	Course	Class	Winner	Team	References
27 September 2026	(France) Cyclo-cross de Saulgé, Saulgé	NE	Diane Frouard (FRA)	CC Marmande 47	
4 October 2026	(France) Cyclo-cross de Naintré, Naintré	NE	Anaïs Morichon (FRA)	AC Lanester 56	
11 October 2026	(France) Cyclo-cross de Vouillé, Vouillé	NE			

==== Pays de la Loire ====
Date	Course	Class	Winner	Team	References
20 September 2026	(France) Cyclo-cross de Grez-Neuville, Grez-Neuville	NE	Elena Beauce (FRA)	Laval Cyclisme 53	
26 September 2026	(France) Cyclo-cross de Palluau, Palluau	NE	Élodie Touffet (FRA)	VC Challandais	
27 September 2026	(France) Cyclo-cross de Notre-Dame-de-Riez, Notre-Dame-de-Riez	NE	Élodie Touffet (FRA)	VC Challandais	
10 October 2026	(France) Cyclo-cross de Saint-Sébastien-sur-Loire, Saint-Sébastien-sur-Loire	NE			

==== 2026 Coupe Pays de la Loire de Cyclo–cross ====
Date	Course	Class	Winner	Team	References
4 October 2026	(France) Cyclo-cross de Vaiges, Vaiges	NE	Justine Gegu (FRA)	Team ELLES	
17 October 2026	(France) Cyclo-cross de Saint-Mars-d'Outillé, Saint-Mars-d'Outillé	NE			
31 October 2026	(France) Cyclo-cross de Machecoul-Saint-Même, Machecoul-Saint-Même	NE			
14 November 2026	(France) Cyclo-cross de Durtal, Durtal	NE			
20 December 2026	(France) Cyclo-cross de Saint-Jean-de-Monts, Saint-Jean-de-Monts	NE			

==== Provence-Alpes-Côte d'Azur ====
Date	Course	Class	Winner	Team	References
20 September 2026	(France) Cyclo-cross de Bollène, Bollène	NE	Léna Bourdon (FRA)	Region Sud Cycling Academy	
3 October 2026	(France) Cyclo-cross de Bormes-les-Mimosas, Bormes-les-Mimosas	NE	Cancelled		
11 October 2026	(France) Cyclo-cross de la Colline Saint-Eutrope, Orange	NE			
11 October 2026	(France) 24ème GPX de La Graille, Saint-Saturnin-lès-Avignon	NE	Cancelled		
17 October 2026	(France) Cyclo-cross de Gap, Gap	NE			
18 October 2026	(France) Cyclo-cross de Eygliers, Eygliers	NE	Cancelled		
18 October 2026	(France) Cyclo-Cross de Château-Gombert, Eygliers	NE	Cancelled		

===== 2026 Challenge Cyclocross Aubagnais =====
Date	Course	Class	Winner	Team	References
4 October 2026	(France) Cyclo-cross d'Aubagne #1, Aubagne	NE	Séverine Corret (FRA)	Natur'Bike Pierrevert	
13 December 2026	(France) Cyclo-cross d'Aubagne #2, Aubagne	NE			

=== Germany ===
Date	Course	Class	Winner	Team	References
12 September 2026	(Germany) 2. Baunataler Cyclocross, Baunatal	NE	Diana Steffenhagen (GER)	MTB Ladies by R-SUSPENSION	
10 October 2026	(Germany) GaloppCross, Bremen	NE	Tomke Windelband (GER)	Harvestehuder RSV v. 1909	
11 October 2026	(Germany) 7. Cross am Park, Blankenfelde-Mahlow	NE	Larissa Luttuschka (GER)	RSV Finsterwalde	

==== 2026 STEVENS Cyclo-Cross-Cup ====
Date	Course	Class	Winner	Team	References
27 September 2026	(Germany) 2026 STEVENS Cyclo-Cross-Cup #1, Neu Duvenstedt	NE	Lina Rausch (GER)	Kieler RV	
3 October 2026	(Germany) 2026 STEVENS Cyclo-Cross-Cup #2, Hanover	NE	Julia-Katharina Pfeil (GER)	Harvestehuder RSV v. 1909	
4 October 2026	(Germany) 2026 STEVENS Cyclo-Cross-Cup #3, Bad Harzburg	NE	Julia-Katharina Pfeil (GER)	Harvestehuder RSV v. 1909	

==== 2026 Weser-Ems Cup ====
Date	Course	Class	Winner	Team	References
26 September 2026	(Germany) 2026 Weser-Ems Cup #1, Oldenburg	NE	Anna Lange (GER)	Siena Garden Racing CX	
27 September 2026	(Germany) 2026 Weser-Ems Cup #2, Syke	NE	Carolin Schiff (GER)		

=== Great Britain ===
==== 2026 Yorkshire Cyclo-cross League ====
Date	Course	Class	Winner	Team	References
20 September 2026	(United Kingdom) 2026 Yorkshire Cyclo-cross Championships #1, Wakefield	NE	Victoria Peel (GBR)	Hope Factory Racing	

==== 2026 Welsh Cyclo-Cross League ====
Date	Course	Class	Winner	Team	References
20 September 2026	(United Kingdom) ( (Wales) ) 2026 Welsh Cyclo-Cross League #1, Risca	NE	Ruby James (GBR)	Hope Factory Racing	

==== 2026 East Kent Cyclo-Cross League ====
Date	Course	Class	Winner	Team	References
13 September 2026	(United Kingdom) 2026 East Kent Cyclo-Cross League #1, Sandwich	NE	Claire Beaumont (GBR)	ViCiOUS VELO	

==== 2026 North West Cyclo-Cross League ====
Date	Course	Class	Winner	Team	References
6 September 2026	(United Kingdom) North West Cyclo-Cross League #1, Manchester	NE	Victoria Peel (GBR)	Hope Factory Racing	
19 September 2026	(United Kingdom) North West Cyclo-Cross League #2, Cowling	NE	Alice Colling (GBR)	Smurfit Westrock Cycling Team	

==== 2026 Wessex Cyclocross League ====
Date	Course	Class	Winner	Team	References
6 September 2026	(United Kingdom) Wessex Cyclocross League #1, Clanfield	NE	Xan Crees (GBR)	OGT p/b USE	
13 September 2026	(United Kingdom) Wessex Cyclocross League #2, Southampton	NE	Xan Crees (GBR)	OGT p/b USE	

==== 2026 West Midlands Cyclo-Cross League ====
Date	Course	Class	Winner	Team	References
6 September 2026	(United Kingdom) West Midlands Cyclo-Cross League #1, Studley	NE	Rebecca Woodvine (GBR)	Fossa Racing	
13 September 2026	(United Kingdom) West Midlands Cyclo-Cross League #2, Shrewsbury	NE	Alderney Baker (GBR)	Team Empella	

==== 2026 CX North East League ====
Date	Course	Class	Winner	Team	References
13 September 2026	(United Kingdom) CX North East League #1, Middlesbrough	NE	Anna Kay (GBR)	Essec Cycling Team	
20 September 2026	(United Kingdom) CX North East League #2, Whitby	NE	Anna Kay (GBR)	Essec Cycling Team	

==== 2026 Eastern Cyclo-Cross League ====
Date	Course	Class	Winner	Team	References
6 September 2026	(United Kingdom) Eastern Cyclo-Cross League #1, Chelmsford	NE	Ellie Mitchinson (GBR)	Exact Power - Versa Energy	
13 September 2026	(United Kingdom) Eastern Cyclo-Cross League #2, Lambourne	NE	Honor Elliott (GBR)		
20 September 2026	(United Kingdom) Eastern Cyclo-Cross League #3, Edwardstone	NE	Abi Miller (GBR)		

==== 2026 Sussex Cyclo-Cross League London & South East Cyclo-Cross League ====
Date	Course	Class	Winner	Team	References
6 September 2026	(United Kingdom) Sussex Cyclo-Cross League London & South East Cyclo-Cross League #1, Brighton	NE	Hope Inglis (GBR)	London Academy	
20 September 2026	(United Kingdom) Sussex Cyclo-Cross League London & South East Cyclo-Cross League #2, Nutley	NE	Louise Mahé (GBR)	Sutton Cycling Club	

=== Italy ===
==== 2026–27 Selle SMP Master Cross series ====
Date	Course	Class	Winner	Team	References
1 November 2026	(Italy) Trofeo Citta' di Firenze, Florence	C2	Giorgia Pellizotti (ITA)	Trinx Factory Team	
22 November 2026	(Italy) Monselice in Rosa Cross, Monselice	NE			
6 December 2026	(Italy) Ciclocross del Brenta, San Pietro in Gu	C2			
8 December 2026	(Italy) Ciclocross del Ponte, Oderzo	C2			
27 December 2026	(Italy) 13° Trofeo Città di San Fior, San Fior	NE			
3 January 2027	(Italy) Gran Premio Città di Vittorio Veneto, Vittorio Veneto	NE			

==== 2026–27 ACSI Cross Marche series ====
Date	Course	Class	Winner	Team	References
3 October 2026	(Italy) Trofeo Corridomnia - Trofeo Vanity, Corridonia	NE	Mery Guerrini (ITA)	HG Cycling Team	
17 October 2026	(Italy) Trofeo Urbisaglia, Urbisaglia	NE	Mery Guerrini (ITA)	HG Cycling Team	
7 November 2026	(Italy) 3° Trofeo Ciclocross Laminox – Trofeo Sarnano, Sarnano	NE	Mery Guerrini (ITA)	HG Cycling Team	
6 January 2027	(Italy) Trofeo San Girio CX, Porto Potenza Picena	NE			
17 January 2027	(Italy) Trofeo Villa Collio, San Severino Marche	NE			

==== 2026–27 Florence Supercross series ====
Date	Course	Class	Winner	Team	References
11 October 2026	(Italy) Florence Supercross #1, Santa Croce sull'Arno	NE	Vera Baldi (ITA)	ASD Freebike Casalguidi	
25 October 2026	(Italy) Florence Supercross #2, Rufina	NE	Vera Baldi (ITA)	ASD Freebike Casalguidi	
1 November 2026	(Italy) Florence Supercross #3, Sarmato	NE	Vera Baldi (ITA)	ASD Freebike Casalguidi	
8 November 2026	(Italy) Florence Supercross #4, Scarperia	NE			
15 November 2026	(Italy) Florence Supercross #5, Pontassieve	NE			
22 November 2026	(Italy) Florence Supercross #6, Impruneta	NE			
29 November 2026	(Italy) Florence Supercross #7, Calenzano	NE			
6 December 2026	(Italy) Florence Supercross #8, Campi Bisenzio	NE			
13 December 2026	(Italy) Florence Supercross #9, Volterra	NE			
20 December 2026	(Italy) Florence Supercross #10, Le Sieci	NE			

==== 2026–27 Lazio CX ====
Date	Course	Class	Winner	Team	References
18 October 2026	(Italy) 3° CX Città di Cerveteri - Memorial Enrico Bonomi – Lazio CX #1, Cerveteri	NE	Anna Rododendro (ITA)	Elba Bike	
25 October 2026	(Italy) 1° Gran Premio Città di Capalbio – 17° Memorial Romano Scotti – 5# Giro delle Regioni Ciclocross, Capalbio	NE	Part of Giro delle Regioni Ciclocross		
8 December 2026	(Italy) 2° Memorial Petta – Lazio CX #3, Ostia	NE			
13 December 2026	(Italy) Lazio CX #4, Ardea	NE			
27 December 2026	(Italy) Lazio CX #5, Vivaro Romano	NE			

==== 2026–27 Adriatico Cross Tour series ====
Date	Course	Class	Winner	Team	References
1 November 2026	(Italy) Adriatico Cross Tour #1, Pianella	NE	Matilde Donati (ITA)	Abruzzo Cycling Team	
8 November 2026	(Italy) Adriatico Cross Tour #2, Petrignano	NE			
15 November 2026	(Italy) Adriatico Cross Tour #3, Notaresco	NE			
22 November 2026	(Italy) Adriatico Cross Tour #4, Barbara	NE			
6 December 2026	(Italy) Adriatico Cross Tour #5, Narni	NE			
13 December 2026	(Italy) Adriatico Cross Tour #6, Narni	NE			
20 December 2026	(Italy) Adriatico Cross Tour #7, Todi	NE			
3 January 2027	(Italy) Adriatico Cross Tour #8, Cattolica	NE			

==== 2026–27 Mediterraneocross ====
Date	Course	Class	Winner	Team	References
11 October 2026	(Italy) 14° Trofeo Ciclocross Città di Viggiano, Viggiano	NE			

==== 2026–27 Trofeo CX del Sud ====
Date	Course	Class	Winner	Team	References
18 October 2026	(Italy) Trofeo CX del Sud #1, Melito di Napoli	NE			

==== 2026 Master Cross Emilia-Romagna ====
Date	Course	Class	Winner	Team	References
18 October 2026	(Italy) Master Cross Emilia-Romagna #1, Castelnovo di Sotto	NE			

=== Spain ===
==== Aragon ====
===== 2026 Copa Aragonesa CX =====
Date	Course	Class	Winner	Team	References
26 September 2026	(Spain) II Ciclocross Villa de Ágreda, Ágreda	NE	Ana López Burgos (ESP)	Huesca La Magia Féminas	
27 September 2026	(Spain) I Ciclocross Villa de Ólvega, Ólvega	NE	Ana López Burgos (ESP)	Huesca La Magia Féminas	
21 November 2026	(Spain) V Trofeo CX Margudgued-Boltaña Zona Zero, Boltaña	NE			
22 November 2026	(Spain) V Trofeo CX Castejón de Sos, Castejón de Sos	NE			
13 December 2026	(Spain) IX CX Utebo, Utebo	NE			
19 December 2026	(Spain) IV Ciclocross Ciudad de Tarazona and IV Ciclocross Internacional Ciudad de Tarazona, Tarazona	C2/NE			
20 December 2026	(Spain) V Ciclocross Villa de Los Fayos, Los Fayos	NE			

==== Asturias ====
Date	Course	Class	Winner	Team	References
3 October 2026	(Spain) IV Ciclocross Corneyu CX Team, Llanera	NE	Carlota Casanueva (ESP)	Castañeda-KIA Off Road	
25 October 2026	(Spain) I Ciclocross Cangas del Narcea, Cangas del Narcea	NE	Estela Fernández Alonso (ESP)	Viella-Guttrans	
29 November 2026	(Spain) IV Ciclocross Concejo de Piloña, Piloña	NE			
6 December 2026	(Spain) 56 Ciclocross La Tenderina Memorial Amadeo Izquierdo, Oviedo	NE			
12 December 2026	(Spain) CX Villa de Luarca, Luarca	NE			
13 December 2026	(Spain) Ciclocross Villa de Navia – Memorial Andrés Méndez, Navia	NE			

==== Basque Country ====
Date	Course	Class	Winner	Team	References
25 October 2026	(Spain) Ormaiztegiko Liv.Nazioarteko Ziklokrossa, Ormaiztegi	C2	Léa Stern (SUI)		
1 November 2026	(Spain) El XXXIII Ciclocross Internacional de Karrantza, Karrantza	C2	Cancelled		
1 November 2026	(Spain) Orduña City Cross 2026, Orduña-Urduña	C2	Sofia Rodríguez (ESP)	Nesta - MMR CX Team	
7 November 2026	(Spain) XI Muskizko Udala Ziklo-Krossa, Muskiz	C2	Sara Cueto (ESP)	Unicaja - Gijon	
15 November 2026	(Spain) Zornotzako Ziklokrosa, Amorebieta-Etxano	NE			
21 November 2026	(Spain) Besa CX Elgoibar, Elgoibar	C2			
22 November 2026	(Spain) Garaje Tolosa Saria – V Memorial Pablo Arsuaga, Tolosa	NE			
28 November 2026	(Spain) Abadiñoko 2026ko Ziklokrosa, Abadiño	NE			
29 November 2026	(Spain) 49. Elorrioko Ziklokrosa, Elorrio	NE			
12 December 2026	(Spain) Gabiriako Ziklokrosa, Gabiria	NE			
13 December 2026	(Spain) VI. Segurako Ziklo Kros Saria, Segura	NE			
19 December 2026	(Spain) III. Ataun San Martin Ziklokrosa, Ataun	NE			
20 December 2026	(Spain) 2027 Euskadiko Ziklo-Kros Txapelketak - Lezamako XVI Ziklokros Zirkuitoa 2026-2027, Lezama	NE			

==== Castilla–La Mancha ====
===== 2026–27 Copa de Ciclocross de Castilla-La Mancha =====
Date	Course	Class	Winner	Team	References
3 October 2026	(Spain) IV Ciclocross Almansa, Almansa	NE	Cancelled		
11 October 2026	(Spain) Campeonatos de Castilla-La Mancha de CX – Memorial Antonio Fernández Matamoros, Ciudad Real	NE	Cancelled		
1 November 2026	(Spain) Copa de Castilla la Mancha, Seseña - 3ª Cyclocross Racing Cup, Seseña	NE	Cancelled		
19 December 2026	(Spain) II Ciclocross Tierra de Gigante, Ciudad Real	NE			
20 December 2026	(Spain) I Ciclocros "La Nación", El Bonillo	NE			

==== Castile and León ====
Date	Course	Class	Winner	Team	References
26 September 2026	(Spain) II Ciclocross Villa de Ágreda, Ágreda	NE	Ana López Burgos (ESP)	Huesca La Magia Féminas	
27 September 2026	(Spain) I Ciclocross "Villa De Olvega", Ólvega	NE	Ana López Burgos (ESP)	Huesca La Magia Féminas	
17 October 2026	(Spain) XXII Ciclocross Ciudad de Medina de Pomar 2026, Medina de Pomar	NE	Nahia Arana (ESP)	Occident Miribilla	
18 October 2026	(Spain) XXIII Ciclocross Villa de Villarcayo 2026, Villarcayo de Merindad de Castilla la Vieja	NE	Nahia Arana (ESP)	Occident Miribilla	
7 November 2026	(Spain) VIII Trofeo CX Ciudad de Ávila - GR100, Ávila	NE	Carla Jiménez Vera y Frías (ESP)	Vèrtize Team-MMR	
8 November 2026	(Spain) I CX Ciudad de Avila Internacional, Ávila	C2	Sara Cueto Vega (ESP)	Unicaja - Gijon	

==== Cantabria ====
===== 2026 Copa Cántabra de Ciclocross =====
Date	Course	Class	Winner	Team	References
8 November 2026	(Spain) Colindres Pueblo 10, Colindres	NE	Marta Beti Pérez (ESP)	G.D. Supermercados Froiz	
14 November 2026	(Spain) IV Ciclocross Ayto. Arenas de Iguña, Arenas de Iguña	NE			
5 December 2026	(Spain) IV Trofeo Ciclocross Reinosa, Reinosa	NE			
14 December 2026	(Spain) XXV Gran Premio Santa Barbara de Ciclocros 2026, Puente Viesgo	NE			

==== Catalonia ====
Date	Course	Class	Winner	Team	References
10 October 2026	(Spain) Trobada Ciclocròs Cambrils, Cambrils	NE	Cancelled		
25 October 2026	(Spain) CX Manlleu - Trofeu Joan Soler, Manlleu	NE	Alba Lara (ESP)	CC Lleida - Dpedros	
1 November 2026	(Spain) Ciclocross de la Garriga, La Garriga	NE	Laia Bosch (ESP)	Massi-Baix Ter	
8 November 2026	(Spain) CX Fornells de la Selva, Fornells de la Selva	NE	María Gutiérrez Pérez (ESP)	LoGOs Energía Factory Team	
15 November 2026	(Spain) Gran Premi KH-7 Ciclocross, Les Franqueses del Vallès	NE			
21 November 2026	(Spain) VI Ciclocross de Gurb Memorial Lluis Vila i Codina, Gurb	NE			
22 November 2026	(Spain) Ciclocròs Ciutat de Vic, Vic	NE			
28 November 2026	(Spain) GP de La Seu D'Urgell, Lleida	NE			
29 November 2026	(Spain) 6e Gran Premi de la Seu d'Urgell, La Seu d'Urgell	NE			
8 December 2026	(Spain) Trofeu Ciutat de Manresa de Ciclocròs, Manresa	NE			
13 December 2026	(Spain) CX Masquefa, Masquefa	NE			
20 December 2026	(Spain) CX Ciutat de Balaguer - Campionat de Catalunya, Balaguer	NE			

==== Galicia ====
===== 2026–27 Superprestixio CX Galicia =====
Date	Course	Class	Winner	Team	References
27 September 2026	(Spain) I Ciclocross Concello de Chantada, Chantada	NE	Laura Mira (ESP)	Supermercados Froiz	
10 October 2026	(Spain) IX Trofeo Ciclocross Avanza Concello do Porriño, O Porriño	NE	Anaïs Morichon (FRA)	AC Lanester 56	
12 October 2026	(Spain) II Trofeo de Ciclocross Concello de Brión, O Porriño	NE	Cancelled		
25 October 2026	(Spain) III CX Concello de Taboada, Taboada	NE	Sarela Conde (ESP)	Academia Postal-Maceda	
7 November 2026	(Spain) XXVIII Trofeo Montes de Eiras de Ciclocross, Pontevedra	NE	Sarela Conde (ESP)	cademia Postal-Maceda	
8 November 2026	(Spain) V Trofeo Ciclocross Grupeta Pan de Zarko., Villa do Porriño, O Porriño	NE	Rebeca Fontela (ESP)	Mais Que Bicis Team	
21 November 2026	(Spain) VI Ciclocross Cocello de Nigran-ZFV Porto do Molle, Nigrán	NE			
29 November 2026	(Spain) 6º Ciclocross Borja Gómez Méndez, Ponteareas	NE			
8 December 2026	(Spain) X Ciclocross Val de Esmelle, Ferrol	NE			
12 December 2026	(Spain) XXXIX Promoción de Ciclismo de Boiro 2026, Boiro	NE			
13 December 2026	(Spain) Ciclocross Concello de Viveiro, Viveiro	NE			
19 December 2026	(Spain) Montes do Támega, Castrelo do Val	NE	Cancelled		
20 December 2026	(Spain) XIX Ciclocross Castelo de Maceda, Maceda	NE			
27 December 2026	(Spain) Campionato de Galicia de Ciclocross 2027 - IX Ciclocross Concello de Betanzos, Betanzos	NE			

==== Community of Madrid ====
===== 2026 Copa Comunidad de Madrid de Ciclocross =====
Date	Course	Class	Winner	Team	References
4 October 2026	(Spain) VIII Trofeo Ayto. Navalafuente - Copa Comunidad De Madrid De Ciclocross, Navalafuente	NE	Patricia Porris Zalewska (ESP)	Capital Racing Team	
14 November 2026	(Spain) V Trofeo CX del Jarama - Copa Comunidad de Madrid, Paracuellos de Jarama	NE			
21 November 2026	(Spain) III Cyclocross Racing Cup - VII Trofeo Ayto. Los Molinos, Los Molinos	NE			
22 November 2026	(Spain) XIII Ciclocross Ayto. Mejorada del Campo - Copa Comunidad de Madrid, Mejorada del Campo	NE			
29 November 2026	(Spain) XXI Ciclocross P.C. Ciclonorte G.P. Villa de Alalpardo - Copa Comunidad de Madrid, Valdeolmos-Alalpardo	NE			
13 December 2026	(Spain) XXII GP CX Ayto. Coslada-Bicicletas Salchi- Campeonato de Madrid, Coslada	NE			

==== Navarra ====
Date	Course	Class	Winner	Team	References
14 November 2026	(Spain) IV Artika CX – Campeonato Navarro de Ciclocross, Artica	NE			

==== Valencian Community ====
===== 2026 Challenge Ciclocross Comunitat Valenciana =====
Date	Course	Class	Winner	Team	References
10 October 2026	(Spain) II Trofeo Ciclocross Construcciones San Jerónimo, Benferri	NE	Sara Bonillo (ESP)	Sueca PC	
11 October 2026	(Spain) Tercer GP Ciclo-Cross Potries, Potríes	NE	Sara Bonillo (ESP)	Sueca PC	
17 October 2026	(Spain) XVIII Trofeu Ciclocross Ajuntament de Picassent, Picassent	NE	Sara Bonillo (ESP)	Sueca PC	
24 October 2026	(Spain) XIII Ciclocross de Aiacor, Canals	NE	Raquel Pérez (ESP)	AM Sonido Riber C.C.	
25 October 2026	(Spain) 11E Trofeu Ciclocross L'Ènova, L'Énova	NE	Sara Bonillo (ESP)	Sueca PC	
31 October 2026	(Spain) I Trofeo Ciclocross Almoravides, Orihuela	NE	Sara Bonillo (ESP)	Sueca PC	
1 November 2026	(Spain) I Torneo Ciclo-cross Villa de Crevillent, Crevillent	NE	Sara Bonillo (ESP)	Sueca PC	
8 November 2026	(Spain) XXIII Ciclocross Ciutat de Carlet - Memorial Javi Bou, Carlet	NE	Sara Bonillo (ESP)	Sueca PC	
15 November 2026	(Spain) IV Ciclocross Ciudad del Ciclismo, Cervera del Maestre	NE			
21 November 2026	(Spain) Ciclocross Ciutat de Gandia, Gandia	NE			
22 November 2026	(Spain) XII Trofeu Villa d'Alginet CX, Alginet	NE			
29 November 2026	(Spain) Trofeo Joaquin Ortega - Campeonato Autonomico Com.Valenciana, Alicante	NE			
8 December 2026	(Spain) VI Gran Premi CX Felipe Orts - La Vila Joiosa, Villajoyosa	NE			
13 December 2026	(Spain) II Ciclocross Masia La Safranera - Alcoy, Alcoy	NE			
20 December 2026	(Spain) Ciclocross Tous, Tous	NE			

=== Switzerland ===
Date	Course	Class	Winner	Team	References
1 November 2026	(Switzerland) Hombiquer, Hombrechtikon	NE	Anna Graf (SUI)	Alpiq Thömus Young	

==== 2026–27 Omnium Romand de Cyclocross ====
Date	Course	Class	Winner	Team	References
3 October 2026	(Switzerland) Omnium Romand de Cyclocross #1, Diablerets	NE	Elodie Python (SUI)	Team Papival Scott Webcaution	
17 October 2026	(Switzerland) Omnium Romand de Cyclocross #2, Corbières	NE	Amandine Moos (SUI)	Cyclophile Sédunois	
24 October 2026	(Switzerland) Omnium Romand de Cyclocross #3, Aigle	NE	Thea Persson (SWE)		
8 November 2026	(Switzerland) Omnium Romand de Cyclocross #4, Rennaz	NE			
14 November 2026	(Switzerland) Omnium Romand de Cyclocross #5, Chailly	NE			
21 November 2026	(Switzerland) Omnium Romand de Cyclocross #6, Martigny	NE			
28 November 2026	(Switzerland) Omnium Romand de Cyclocross #7, Porrentruy	NE			
6 December 2026	(Switzerland) Omnium Romand de Cyclocross #8, Bramois	NE			

==== 2026 ORC Women's Cup ====
Date	Course	Class	Winner	Team	References
3 October 2026	(Switzerland) ORC Women's Cup #1, Diablerets	NE	Elodie Python (SUI)	Team Papival Scott Webcaution	
17 October 2026	(Switzerland) ORC Women's Cup #2, Corbières	NE	Amandine Moos (SUI)	Cyclophile Sédunois	
24 October 2026	(Switzerland) ORC Women's Cup #3, Aigle	NE	Elsa Elf Boberg (SWE)		
8 November 2026	(Switzerland) ORC Women's Cup #4, Rennaz	NE			
14 November 2026	(Switzerland) ORC Women's Cup #5, Chailly	NE			
21 November 2026	(Switzerland) ORC Women's Cup #6, Martigny	NE			
28 November 2026	(Switzerland) ORC Women's Cup #7, Porrentruy	NE			
6 December 2026	(Switzerland) ORC Women's Cup #8, Bramois	NE			

==== 2026 Afeno Cup ====
Date	Course	Class	Winner	Team	References
3 October 2026	(Switzerland) Afeno Cup #1, Boningen	NE	Milou Meeuse (SUI)		
10 October 2026	(Switzerland) Afeno Cup #2, Riniken	NE	Milou Meeuse (SUI)		
24 October 2026	(Switzerland) Afeno Cup #3, Balsthal	NE	Milou Meeuse (SUI)		
31 October 2026	(Switzerland) Afeno Cup #4, Brunnersberg	NE	Milou Meeuse (SUI)		
7 November 2026	(Switzerland) Afeno Cup #5, Möhlin	NE	Milou Meeuse (SUI)		
14 November 2026	(Switzerland) Afeno Cup #6, Muttenz	NE			
21 November 2026	(Switzerland) Afeno Cup #7, Pfaffnau	NE			

== Continental Championships (CC) ==
Country	Date	Elite	U23	Juniors	Youth
Balkan Cyclocross Championships	25 October 2026	Men's: (gold) : (Romania) Jozsef-Attila Málnási; (silver) : (Moldova) Mihail Doaga; (bronze) : (North Macedonia) Kiril Ancevski; Women's: (gold) : — (silver) : — (bronze) : —	Men's: (gold) : (Romania) Luca Bodareu; (silver) : (Romania) Radu Marian Măda; (bronze) : (Romania) David Fabian Motoran; Women's: (gold) : (Romania) Wendy Bunea; (silver) : (Romania) Miruna Măda; (bronze) : (Romania) Giulia Pârvu	Men's: (gold) : (Romania) Milan Bartha; (silver) : (Romania) Roland Szigyártó; (bronze) : (Romania) Lorenzo-Ștefan Cătană; Women's: (gold) : (North Macedonia) Dalija Stojanovska; (silver) : (Romania) Brigitte Belu; (bronze) : (Romania) Denisa Mărcuș	Men's: (gold) : (Romania) Ștefan Mihai Bocsan; (silver) : (Romania) Koréh Tamás; (bronze) : (Romania) David Alexandru Stroe; Women's: (gold) : (Romania) Ana Văduva; (silver) : (Romania) Zsófia Takács; (bronze) : (North Macedonia) Olja Cvetanova
Pan American Cyclo-cross Championships	7 November 2026	Men's: (gold) : (United States) Eric Brunner; (silver) : (United States) Andrew Strohmeyer; (bronze) : (United States) Dylan Zakrajsek; Women's: (gold) : (United States) Alyssa Sarkisov; (silver) : (United States) Lidia Cusack; (bronze) : (Canada) Sidney McGill	Men's: (gold) : (United States) Miles Mattern; (silver) : (United States) Aidan Vollmuth; (bronze) : (United States) Dylan Haynes; Women's: (gold) : (United States) Ada Watson; (silver) : (United States) Kaya Musgrave; (bronze) : (Canada) Aislin Hallahan	Men's: (gold) : (United States) Noah Scholnick; (silver) : (United States) Rylan Zacharek; (bronze) : (United States) Finnley Sonnemann; Women's: (gold) : (United States) Lilliana O'Donnell; (silver) : (Canada) Alexa Haviland; (bronze) : (Canada) Anna Christensen	
UEC Cyclo-cross European Championships	7–8 November 2026	Men's: (gold) : (Belgium) Thibau Nys; (silver) : (Belgium) Joran Wyseure; (bronze) : (Belgium) Niels Vandeputte; Women's: (gold) : (Netherlands) Lucinda Brand; (silver) : (Luxembourg) Marie Schreiber; (bronze) : (Netherlands) Ceylin del Carmen Alvarado	Men's: (gold) : (France) Aubin Sparfel; (silver) : (Belgium) Giel Lejeune; (bronze) : (Belgium) Viktor Vandenberghe; Women's: (gold) : (France) Célia Gery; (silver) : (France) Lison Desprez; (bronze) : (France) Amandine Muller	Men's: (gold) : (Belgium) Lars Peers; (silver) : (Netherlands) Delano Heeren; (bronze) : (Belgium) Bas Vanden Eynde; Women's: (gold) : (Belgium) Lentel Huys; (silver) : (Switzerland) Shana Huber; (bronze) : (Netherlands) Nynke Jochems	

== National Championships (NC) ==
Country	Date	Elite	U23	Juniors
Australia	15 August 2026	Garry Millburn; Fiona Morris	Hayden Vimpani; Alana Fletcher	Billy Van Hout; Amaya Shaw
Canada	31 October 2026	Tyler Clark; Sidney McGill	Rhett Bates; Nico Knoll	Jon Mercier; Alexa Haviland
Chile	22 August 2026	Patricio Campbell; Fernanda Castro	Joaquín Muñoz	Misol Pacheco
Estonia	1 November 2026	Matthias Mõttus; Janika Lõiv	—N/a	Niklas Lond; Marta Mõttus
Finland	24 October 2026	Aksel Rantanen; Hanna Häkkinen	—N/a	Kasperi Nieminen; Stella Suuronen
Latvia	7 November 2026	Māris Bogdanovičs; Evelīna Ermane-Marčenko	Helvijs Kancers	Kristers Bruno Štrauhmanis; Lauma Lange
Lithuania	25 October 2026	Ignas Ambrazas; Neimantė Laužikaitė	Martynas Medelinskas; Deimantė Zelenauskaitė	Lukas Skikas; Irmantė Aleliūnaitė
New Zealand	31 August 2026	Calum Chamberlain; Sonia Foote	Benjamin Harding	Torin Leonard; Sophie Hiswin
Norway	14 November 2026	Kevin Sandli Messel; Oda Laforce	—N/a	Linus Gregersen Bolstad; Therese Moe Landén
