= 2024–25 UCI Cyclo-cross season =

Bicycle racing competition

Details
- Dates: August 2024 –
- Location: World

The calendar for the 2024–2025 men's and women's cyclo-cross season includes cyclo-cross races starting in September 2024, and ending in February 2025. The individual events are classified into five categories. The highest category includes the world cup events (CDM), which gives rise to a ranking. Behind them, we find the C1 and C2 category races, which award points are for the world ranking, then the races reserved for those under 23, also called hopes (category CU) and finally the races for juniors (category CJ) . There are also national championships (NC) which are organized in about thirty countries.

== Men's Elite ==
=== Events ===
==== August ====
Date	Course	Class	Winner	Team	References
18 August 2024	(Australia) Ballarat XC, Ballarat	C2	Tristan Nash (AUS)		

==== September ====
Date	Course	Class	Winner	Team	References
7 September 2024	(United States) Englewood Open CX Day 1, Fall River	C2	Caleb Swartz (USA)	ENVE/ Forward Endurance Coaching	
8 September 2024	(United States) Englewood Open CX Day 2, Fall River	C2	Scott Funston (USA)	Cervelo Orange Living	
14 September 2024	(United Kingdom) Hope Supercross Round 1, Tong	C2	Thomas Mein (GBR)	Hope Factory Racing	
15 September 2024	(United Kingdom) Hope Supercross Round 2, Tong	C2	Thomas Mein (GBR)	Hope Factory Racing	
18 September 2024	(United Kingdom) Hope Supercross Round 3, Wyke	C2	Thomas Mein (GBR)	Hope Factory Racing	
21 September 2024	(United Kingdom) Hope Supercross Round 4, Wyke	C2	Yorben Lauryssen (BEL)	Pauwels Sauzen–Bingoal	
22 September 2024	(Switzerland) Radcross Illnau, Illnau-Effretikon	C1	Kevin Kuhn (SUI)	Intermarché–Wanty	

==== October ====
Date	Course	Class	Winner	Team	References
6 October 2024	(Czech Republic) Grand Prix Ostrava, Ostrava	C1	Victor van de Putte (BEL)	Deschacht - Hens - FSP	
6 October 2024	(France) Brumath Bike Festival, Brumath	C1	Niels Vandeputte (BEL)	Alpecin–Deceuninck	
12 October 2024	(United States) Major Taylor Cross Cup Day 1, Indianapolis	C2	Caleb Swartz (USA)	ENVE Composites	
13 October 2024	(Republic of Ireland) Verge Cross Clonmel, Clonmel	C2	Jenson Young (GBR)	Team Spectra Cannondale	
13 October 2024	(United States) Major Taylor Cross Cup Day 2, Indianapolis	C2	Gunnar Holmgren (CAN)	Brent Jens MTB Team	
17 October 2024	(Belgium) Kermiscross, Ardooie	C2	Michael Vanthourenhout (BEL)	Pauwels Sauzen–Bingoal	
19 October 2024	(Italy) #1 Master Cross – GP Internazionale CX Citta' di Jesolo, Jesolo	C2	Filippo Agostinacchio (ITA)	FAS Airport Services - Guerciotti	
19 October 2024	(United States) Kings CX Day 1, Mason	C1	Eric Brunner (USA)	Competitive Edge Racing	
20 October 2024	(United States) Kings CX Day 2, Mason	C2	Eric Brunner (USA)	Competitive Edge Racing	
26 October 2024	(Denmark) Party Prijs CK Aarhus Day 1, Aarhus	C2	Wout Janssen (BEL)	Cyclis - Van den Plas CX Team	
26 October 2024	(Italy) #2 Master Cross – International Cyclocross Increa Brugherio, Brugherio	C1	Gioele Bertolini (ITA)	FAS Airport Services - Guerciotti	
26 October 2024	(United States) Really Rad Festival of Cyclocross Day 1, Falmouth	C1	Andrew Strohmeyer (USA)	CXD Trek Bikes	
27 October 2024	(Denmark) Party Prijs CK Aarhus Day 2, Aarhus	C2	Wout Janssen (BEL)	Cyclis - Van den Plas CX Team	
27 October 2024	(Italy) Grand Prix Cicli Francesconi Salvirola, Salvirola	C2	Gioele Bertolini (ITA)	FAS Airport Services - Guerciotti	
27 October 2024	(United States) Really Rad Festival of Cyclocross Day 2, Falmouth	C2	Henry Coote (USA)	Competitive Edge Racing	

==== November ====
Date	Course	Class	Winner	Team	References
1 November 2024	(France) Cyclo-cross International de Dijon, Dijon	C2	Valentin Remondet (FRA)	Ardennes Cross Team Gecibat	
1 November 2024	(Italy) Trofeo Citta' di Firenze, San Piero a Sieve	C2	Cristian Cominelli (ITA)	Cycling Cafè Racing Team	
2 November 2024	(France) Rivabellacross, Ouistreham	C2	Thomas Mein (GBR)	Hope Factory Racing	
2 November 2024	(United States) Thunder Cross, Missoula	C2	Ian Ackert (CAN)	Treck Future Racing	
10 November 2024	(Italy) Turin International Cyclocross, Turin	C2	Gioele Bertolini (ITA)	FAS Airport Services - Guerciotti	
16 November 2024	(France) Cyclo-cross Gernelle, Gernelle	C2	Rémi Lelandais (FRA)	Arkéa–B&B Hotels	
16 November 2024	(United States) Nash Dash Day 1, Hampton	C2	Kerry Werner (USA)	Groove Subaru Cycling Team	
17 November 2024	(United States) Nash Dash Day 2, Hampton	C2	Kerry Werner (USA)	Groove Subaru Cycling Team	
17 November 2024	(Canada) Cyclo-cross de Lévis, Lévis	C2	Ian Ackert (CAN)	Trek Future Racing	
23 November 2024	(United States) North Carolina Grand Prix Day 1, Hendersonville	C2	Eric Brunner (USA)	Competitive Edge Racing	
24 November 2024	(United States) North Carolina Grand Prix Day 2, Hendersonville	C2	Eric Brunner (USA)	Competitive Edge Racing	
30 November 2024	(Spain) Trofeo Ciclo-Cross Rafa Valls Cocentaina, Cocentaina	C2	Yorben Lauryssen (BEL)	Pauwels Sauzen–Bingoal	

==== December ====
Date	Course	Class	Winner	Team	References
1 December 2024	(Italy) Gran Premio Guerciotti Brembate, Brembate	C2	Filippo Fontana (ITA)	CS Carabinieri - Cicli Olympia	
7 December 2024	(Spain) Ciclocross Internacional Ciudad de Tarazona, Tarazona	C2	Yorben Lauryssen (BEL)	Pauwels Sauzen–Bingoal	
8 December 2024	(Spain) Ziklo Kross Igorre, Igorre	C2	Yorben Lauryssen (BEL)	Pauwels Sauzen–Bingoal	
24 December 2024	(Italy) Cross Della Vigilia Albiate, Albiate	C2	Cancelled		

==== January ====
Date	Course	Class	Winner	Team	References
4 January 2025	(Spain) Amurrioko Ziklo-Krossa, Amurrio	C2	Kevin Suárez (ESP)	Nesta - MMR CX Team	
6 January 2025	(Italy) Memorial Romano Scotti Follonica 2025, Follonica	C2	Cancelled		
13 January 2025	(Belgium) Nationale Cyclo-Cross Otegem, Otegem	C2	Toon Aerts (BEL)	Deschacht - Hens - FSP	

==== February ====
Date	Course	Class	Winner	Team	References
23 February 2025	(Belgium) Sluitingsprijs Oostmalle, Oostmalle	C1	Joris Nieuwenhuis (NED)	Ridley Racing Team	

== 2024–25 UCI Cyclo-cross World Cup ==
Date	Course	Class	Winner	Team	References
24 November 2024	(Belgium) World Cup #1, Antwerpen	CDM	Eli Iserbyt (BEL)	Pauwels Sauzen–Bingoal	
1 December 2024	(Republic of Ireland) World Cup #2, Dublin	CDM	Michael Vanthourenhout (BEL)	Pauwels Sauzen–Bingoal	
8 December 2024	(Italy) World Cup #3, Cabras	CDM	Cancelled		
15 December 2024	(Belgium) World Cup #4, Namur	CDM	Michael Vanthourenhout (BEL)	Pauwels Sauzen–Bingoal	
21 December 2024	(Netherlands) World Cup #5, Hulst	CDM	Niels Vandeputte (BEL)	Alpecin–Deceuninck	
22 December 2024	(Belgium) World Cup #6, Zonhoven	CDM	Mathieu van der Poel (NED)	Alpecin–Deceuninck	
26 December 2024	(Belgium) World Cup #7, Gavere	CDM	Mathieu van der Poel (NED)	Alpecin–Deceuninck	
29 December 2024	(France) World Cup #8, Besançon	CDM	Mathieu van der Poel (NED)	Alpecin–Deceuninck	
5 January 2025	(Belgium) World Cup #9, Dendermonde	CDM	Wout van Aert (BEL)	Visma–Lease a Bike	
19 January 2025	(Spain) World Cup #10, Benidorm	CDM	Thibau Nys (BEL)	Baloise Glowi Lions	
25 January 2025	(Belgium) World Cup #11, Maasmechelen	CDM	Mathieu van der Poel (NED)	Alpecin–Deceuninck	
26 January 2025	(Netherlands) World Cup #12, Hoogerheide	CDM	Mathieu van der Poel (NED)	Alpecin–Deceuninck	

== 2024–25 Cyclo-cross Superprestige ==
Date	Course	Class	Winner	Team	References
20 October 2024	(Belgium) Superprestige #1, Cyclo-cross Ruddervoorde, Oostkamp	C1	Joran Wyseure (BEL)	Crelan-Corendon	
27 October 2024	(Belgium) Superprestige #2, Druivencross, Overijse	C1	Thibau Nys (BEL)	Baloise–Trek Lions	
11 November 2024	(Belgium) Superprestige #3, Jaarmarktcross, Niel	C1	Laurens Sweeck (BEL)	Crelan-Corendon	
16 November 2024	(Belgium) Superprestige #4, Aardbeiencross, Merksplas	C1	Laurens Sweeck (BEL)	Crelan-Corendon	
23 December 2024	(Belgium) Superprestige #5, Zilvermeercross, Mol	C2	Mathieu van der Poel (NED)	Alpecin–Deceuninck	
30 December 2024	(Belgium) Superprestige #6, Diegem	C1	Laurens Sweeck (BEL)	Crelan-Corendon	
4 January 2025	(Belgium) Superprestige #7, Wevelgem	C2	Wout van Aert (BEL)	Visma–Lease a Bike	
8 February 2025	(Belgium) Superprestige #8, Noordzeecross, Middelkerke	C1	Joris Nieuwenhuis (NED)	Ridley Racing Team	

== 2024–2025 X²O Badkamers Trophy ==
Date	Course	Class	Winner	Team	References
1 November 2024	(Belgium) X²O Badkamers Trophy #1, Koppenbergcross, Oudenaarde	C1	Lars van der Haar (NED)	Baloise–Trek Lions	
10 November 2024	(Belgium) X²O Badkamers Trophy #2, Rapencross, Lokeren	C2	Thibau Nys (BEL)	Baloise–Trek Lions	
17 November 2024	(Belgium) X²O Badkamers Trophy #3, Flandriencross, Hamme	C1	Niels Vandeputte (BEL)	Alpecin–Deceuninck	
14 December 2024	(Belgium) X²O Badkamers Trophy #4, Herentals	C2	Michael Vanthourenhout (BEL)	Pauwels Sauzen–Bingoal	
1 January 2025	(Belgium) X²O Badkamers Trophy #5, Grand Prix Sven Nys, Baal	C1	Eli Iserbyt (BEL)	Pauwels Sauzen–Cibel Clementines	
3 January 2025	(Belgium) X²O Badkamers Trophy #6, Duinencross, Koksijde	C1	Laurens Sweeck (BEL)	Crelan - Corendon	
9 February 2025	(Belgium) X²O Badkamers Trophy #7, Krawatencross, Lille	C1	Laurens Sweeck (BEL)	Crelan - Corendon	
16 February 2025	(Belgium) X²O Badkamers Trophy #8, Brussels Universities Cyclocross, Brussels	C1	Michael Vanthourenhout (BEL)	Pauwels Sauzen–Cibel Clementines	

== 2024–2025 Exact Cross ==
Date	Course	Class	Winner	Team	References
12 October 2024	(Belgium) Exact Cross #1, Be-Mine Cross, Beringen	C2	Lars van der Haar (NED)	Baloise–Trek Lions	
19 October 2024	(Belgium) Exact Cross #2, Essen	C2	Laurens Sweeck (BEL)	Crelan - Corendon	
26 October 2024	(Belgium) Exact Cross #3, Heerde	C2	Eli Iserbyt (BEL)	Pauwels Sauzen–Bingoal	
23 November 2024	(Belgium) Exact Cross #4, Urban Cross, Kortrijk	C2	Eli Iserbyt (BEL)	Pauwels Sauzen–Bingoal	
27 December 2024	(Belgium) Exact Cross #5, Azencross, Loenhout	C1	Mathieu van der Poel (NED)	Alpecin–Deceuninck	
5 February 2025	(Belgium) Exact Cross #6, Parkcross, Maldegem	C2	Laurens Sweeck (BEL)	Crelan - Corendon	
15 February 2025	(Belgium) Exact Cross #7, Waaslandcross, Sint-Niklaas	C2	Niels Vandeputte (BEL)	Alpecin–Deceuninck	

== 2024 UEC European Cup ==
Date	Course	Class	Winner	Team	References
19 October 2024	(Hungary) UEC European Cup #1, Debrecen	C2	Barnabás Vas (HUN)	Cube-Csömör	
20 October 2024	(Hungary) UEC European Cup #2, Debrecen	C2	Barnabás Vas (HUN)	Cube-Csömör	
26 October 2024	(Romania) UEC European Cup #3, Vatra Dornei	–	Victor-Alexandru Aron (ROU)	BikeXpert Racing Team	
17 November 2024	(Slovakia) UEC European Cup #4, Šamorín	–	Václav Ježek (CZE)	Brilon Racing Team MB	

== Men's National Cup's and Series ==
=== Australia ===
Date	Course	Class	Winner	Team	References
25 May 2024	(Australia) 2024 AusCycling CX National Series Round 1, Adelaide	NE	Tristan Nash (AUS)	Midland CC	
26 May 2024	(Australia) 2024 AusCycling CX National Series Round 2, Adelaide	NE	Tristan Nash (AUS)	Midland CC	
15 June 2024	(Australia) 2024 AusCycling CX National Series Round 3, Herston	NE	Tristan Nash (AUS)	Midland CC	
16 June 2024	(Australia) 2024 AusCycling CX National Series Round 4, Herston	NE	Nicholas Smith (AUS)	Southern Highlands CC	
20 July 2024	(Australia) 2024 AusCycling CX National Series Round 5, Randwick	NE	Tristan Nash (AUS)	Midland CC	
21 July 2024	(Australia) 2024 AusCycling CX National Series Round 6, Randwick	NE	Tristan Nash (AUS)	Midland CC	

=== Austria ===
Date	Course	Class	Winner	Team	References
12 September 2024	(Austria) Bad Ischler Radquerfeldein, Bad Ischl	NE	Valentin Hofer (AUT)	Cannibal B Victorious	
5 October 2024	(Austria) Quer durchs Stadion, Pernitz	NE	Christoph Holzer (AUT)	C-Sou Cycling Team	
12 October 2024	(Austria) Lagerhaus GP, Korneuburg	NE	Christoph Soukup (AUT)	C-Sou Cycling Team	
13 October 2024	(Austria) King & Queen of Seeschlacht powered by Bikestore.cc, Langenzersdorf	NE	Jakob Reiter (AUT)	Hrinkow Advarics	
20 October 2024	(Austria) St. Pöltner Querfeldein im Kaiserwald, Sankt Pölten	NE	Jakob Reiter (AUT)	Hrinkow Advarics	
26 October 2024	(Austria) Wienenergie Cyclocross Day 1, Pottendorf	NE	Jakob Reiter (AUT)	Hrinkow Advarics	
27 October 2024	(Austria) Wienenergie Cyclocross Day 2, Pottendorf	NE	Jakob Reiter (AUT)	Hrinkow Advarics	
3 November 2024	(Austria) Steiner Cross pb RC Ovilava, Wels	NE	Philipp Heigl (AUT)	SU Bikestore.cc Team	
16 November 2024	(Austria) GP Ternitz, Ternitz	NE	Jakob Reiter (AUT)	Hrinkow Advarics	
17 November 2024	(Austria) GP Ternitz um die Preise des ARBÖ, Ternitz	NE	Jakob Reiter (AUT)	Hrinkow Advarics	
24 November 2024	(Austria) Radquerfeldein GP um das Sportzentrum Gunskirchen, Gunskirchen	NE	František Hojka (CZE)	Expres CZ BMD Kolín	
1 December 2024	(Austria) Park-Cross Böheimkirchen, Böheimkirchen	NE	Cancelled		
15 December 2024	(Austria) 2.CX-Mas Cross Gerasdorf, Gerasdorf bei Wien	NE	Tomáš Bakus (CZE)	ČEZ Cyklo Team Tábor	
6 January 2025	(Austria) 3KöniXcrosS St. Pölten, Sankt Pölten	NE	František Hojka (CZE)	Expres CZ BMD Kolín	

=== Belgium ===
Date	Course	Class	Winner	Team	References
7 September 2024	2024 Belgium CX National Series Round 1, Londerzeel	NE	Ingmar Uytdewilligen (BEL)	Athletes for Hope	
8 September 2024	2024 Belgium CX National Series Round 2, Nijlen	NE	Ingmar Uytdewilligen (BEL)	Athletes for Hope	
15 September 2024	2024 Belgium CX National Series Round 3, Wiekevorst	NE	Thomas Verheyen (BEL)	Antwerp Cycling Team Kontich	
29 September 2024	2024 Belgium CX National Series Round 4, Kasterlee	NE	Thomas Verheyen (BEL)	Antwerp Cycling Team Kontich	
19 October 2024	2024 Belgium CX National Series Round 5, Eversel	NE	Mathijs Wuyts (BEL)		
20 October 2024	2024 Belgium CX National Series Round 6, Patattencross, Nossegem	NE	Ingmar Uytdewilligen (BEL)	Athletes for Hope	
27 October 2024	2024 Belgium CX National Series Round 7, Herenthout	NE	Niels Ceulemans (BEL)	LRG - Cycling Team	
3 November 2024	2024 Belgium CX National Series Round 8, Rijkevorsel	NE	Ingmar Uytdewilligen (BEL)	Athletes for Hope	
16 November 2024	2024 Belgium CX National Series Round 9, Ravestein Parkcross, Hever	NE	Arthur Soontjens (BEL)	Cyclis - Van den Plas Cycling Team	
30 November 2024	2024 Belgium CX National Series Round 10, Ardooie	NE	Robin Alderweireld (BEL)	Team Atom 6	
22 December 2024	2024 Belgium CX National Series Round 11, Oosterzele	NE	Robin Alderweireld (BEL)	Team Atom 6	
26 December 2024	2024 Belgium CX National Series Round 12, Beernem	NE	Ingmar Uytdewilligen (BEL)	Athletes for Hope	
28 December 2024	2024 Belgium CX National Series Round 13, Borgloon	NE	Thomas Verheyen (BEL)	RB Zelfbouw UCT	
4 January 2025	2024 Belgium CX National Series Round 14, Vilvoorde	NE	Wietse Bosmans (BEL)	Scott Velodome Racing Team	
18 January 2025	2024 Belgium CX National Series Round 15, Gierle	NE	Ingmar Uytdewilligen (BEL)	Athletes for Hope	
19 January 2025	2024 Belgium CX National Series Round 15, Bekkevoort	NE	Arthur Soontjens (BEL)	Cyclis - Van den Plas Cycling Team	
26 January 2025	2024 Belgium CX National Series Round 16, Hoogstraten	NE	Mathijs Wuyts (BEL)		

=== Chile ===
Date	Course	Class	Winner	Team	References
28 April 2024	2024 Chile CX Cup 1, Pirque	NE	Patricio Campbell (CHI)		
5 May 2024	2024 Chile CX Cup 2, Pudahuel	NE	Patricio Campbell (CHI)		
18 May 2024	2024 Chile CX Cup 3, San Fernando	NE	Patricio Campbell (CHI)		
2 June 2024	2024 Chile CX Cup 4, Curacavi	NE	Juan Pablo Agloni (CHI)		
22 June 2024	2024 Chile CX Cup 5, Valdivia	NE	Patricio Campbell (CHI)		
23 June 2024	2024 Chile CX Cup 6, Temuco	NE	Patricio Campbell (CHI)		
7 July 2024	2024 Chile CX Cup 7, Peñalolen	NE	Patricio Campbell (CHI)		
21 July 2024	2024 Chile CX Cup 8, Estacion Central	NE	Patricio Campbell (CHI)		
4 August 2024	2024 Chile CX Cup 9, Pirque	NE	Patricio Farías (CHI)		
25 August 2024	2024 Chile CX Cup 10, Cerro Navia	NE	Patricio Campbell (CHI)		

=== Czechia ===
Date	Course	Class	Winner	Team	References
28 September 2024	(Czech Republic) 2024 HSF System Cup 1, Veselí nad Lužnicí	C2	Cancelled		
5 October 2024	(Czech Republic) 2024 HSF System Cup 2 – Grand Prix Ostrava, Ostrava	C2	Victor van de Putte (BEL)	Deschacht - Hens - FSP	
12 October 2024	(Czech Republic) 2024 HSF System Cup 3, Hlinsko	C2	Michael Boroš (CZE)	Elkov–Kasper	
19 October 2024	(Czech Republic) 2024 HSF System Cup 4, Louny	NE	No Elite here		
20 October 2024	(Czech Republic) 2024 HSF System Cup 5, Čáslav	C2	Michael Boroš (CZE)	Elkov–Kasper	
26 October 2024	(Czech Republic) 2024 HSF System Cup 6, Kolín	C2	Michael Boroš (CZE)	Elkov–Kasper	
9 November 2024	(Czech Republic) 2024 HSF System Cup 7, Plzeň	C2	Michael Boroš (CZE)	Elkov–Kasper	
16 November 2024	(Czech Republic) 2024 HSF System Cup 8, Rýmařov	C2	Michael Boroš (CZE)	Elkov–Kasper	
23 November 2024	(Czech Republic) 2024 HSF System Cup 9, Mladá Boleslav	C2	Marek Konwa (POL)	TJ Auto Škoda MB	
30 November 2024	(Czech Republic) 2024 HSF System Cup 10, Chýnov	NC	No Elite here		
7–8 December 2024	(Czech Republic) 2024 HSF System Cup 11, Uničov	C2	Marek Konwa (POL)	TJ Auto Škoda MB	

=== Denmark ===
Date	Course	Class	Winner	Team	References
3 November 2024	(Denmark) Challenge Cross-Cup I, Roskilde	NC	Karl-Erik Rosendahl (DEN)	Adventure Cycling UNITY	
10 November 2024	(Denmark) Challenge Cross-Cup II, Sorø	NC	Daniel Weis Nielsen (DEN)	Decathlon–AG2R La Mondiale Development Team	
16 November 2024	(Denmark) Challenge Cross-Cup III, Skive	NC	Daniel Weis Nielsen (DEN)	Decathlon–AG2R La Mondiale Development Team	
24 November 2024	(Denmark) Challenge Cross-Cup IV, Odense	NC	Jonas Posselt Gamborg (DEN)	Aarhus MTB	
8 December 2024	(Denmark) Challenge Cross-Cup V, Ballerup	NC	Mads Schulz Jørgensen (DEN)	Team IBT - Tripeak	
15 December 2024	(Denmark) Challenge Cross-Cup VI, Ballerup	NC	Mathias Houmann Petersen (DEN)	Næstved Bicycle Club	
5 January 2025	(Denmark) Challenge Cross-Cup VII, Kalundborg	NC	Daniel Weis Nielsen (DEN)	Decathlon–AG2R La Mondiale Development Team	

=== Estonia ===
Date	Course	Class	Winner	Team	References
22 September 2024	(Estonia) Viljandi CX, Viljandi	NC	Matthias Mõttus (EST)	Haanja Rattaklubi	
28 September 2024	(Estonia) Rapla CX, Rapla	NC	Matīss Kaļveršs (LVA)	Salaspils zirini	
5 October 2024	(Estonia) Elva CX, Elva	NC	Markus Mäeuibo (EST)	Hawaii Express	
12 October 2024	(Estonia) Tallinn CX, Tallinn	NC	Markus Pajur (EST)	Arkéa–B&B Hotels	
19 October 2024	(Estonia) Rakke CX, Rakke	NC	Markus Pajur (EST)	Arkéa–B&B Hotels	

=== Finland ===
Date	Course	Class	Winner	Team	References
21 September 2024	(Finland) Rajamäki CX – Finnish Cup #1, Helsinki	NC	Elias Eskelinen (FIN)	RaKe	
29 September 2024	(Finland) Krossikommuuni Oulu – Finnish Cup #2, Kempele	NC	Elias Eskelinen (FIN)	RaKe	
13 October 2024	(Finland) Olari CX – Finnish Cup #3, Olari	NC	Elias Eskelinen (FIN)	RaKe	
26–27 October 2024	(Finland) Tuusula CX – Finnish Cup #4, Tuusula	NC	Antti-Jussi Juntunen (FIN)	Voltas–Tartu 2024 by CCN	
3 November 2024	(Finland) Kivikko Prestige – Finnish Cup #5, Kivikko	NC	Elias Eskelinen (FIN)	RaKe	

=== France ===
Date	Course	Class	Winner	Team	References
19 October 2024	(France) French Cup #1, Nommay	C2	Loris Rouiller (SUI)	Heizomat Radteam	
20 October 2024	(France) French Cup #2, Nommay	C2	Loris Rouiller (SUI)	Heizomat Radteam	
9 November 2024	(France) French Cup #3, Pierric	C2	Timothé Gabriel (FRA)		
10 November 2024	(France) French Cup #4, Pierric	C2	David Menut (FRA)	AS Bike Racing	
23 November 2024	(France) French Cup #5, Troyes	C2	David Menut (FRA)	AS Bike Racing	
24 November 2024	(France) French Cup #6, Troyes	C2	David Menut (FRA)	AS Bike Racing	
14 December 2024	(France) French Cup #7, La Ferté-Bernard	C2	Joshua Dubau (FRA)	Decathlon Ford Racing Team	
15 December 2024	(France) French Cup #8, La Ferté-Bernard	C2	David Menut (FRA)	AS Bike Racing	

=== Germany ===
Date	Course	Class	Winner	Team	References
7 September 2024	(Germany) Internationaler GGEW Grand Prix Bensheim – Bundesliga #1, Bensheim	C2	Loris Rouiller (SUI)	Heizomat Radteam	
8 September 2024	(Germany) 4 Bikes Festival – Bundesliga #2, Lützelbach	C2	Cancelled		
21 September 2024	(Germany) International Cyclo-Cross Bad Salzdetfurth #1 – Bundesliga 3, Bad Salzdetfurth	C2	Federico Ceolin (ITA)	Bibione Cycling Team	
22 September 2024	(Germany) International Cyclo-Cross Bad Salzdetfurth #2 – Bundesliga 4, Bad Salzdetfurth	C2	Marek Konwa (POL)	Team Auto Škoda MTB	
6 October 2024	(Germany) Bundesliga #5, Düsseldorf	C2	Cancelled		
20 October 2024	(Germany) Rund um den Lohner Aussichtsturm – Bundesliga 6, Lohne	NE	Eike Behrens (GER)	STEVENS Racing Team	
26–27 October 2024	(Germany) Bundesliga #7, München	C2	Cancelled		
9 November 2024	(Germany) Vaihinger Radcross – Bundesliga 8, Vaihingen an der Enz	NE	Fabian Eder (GER)	Heizomat Radteam	
10 November 2024	(Germany) Magstadter Radcross – Bundesliga 9, Magstadt	NE	Fabian Eder (GER)	Heizomat Radteam	
16 November 2024	(Germany) Bundesliga 10, Kleinmachnow	NE	Florian Anderle (GER)		
17 November 2024	(Germany) Bundesliga 11, Kleinmachnow	NE	Eike Behrens (GER)	STEVENS Racing Team	
7–8 December 2024	Bundesliga 12 – Championships off all states of Germany, –, Bad Salzdetfurth, Neubrandenburg,	NE	(Baden-Württemberg) Simon Schneller (Lower Saxony) Sören Kieselbach (Mecklenburg-Vorpommern) Martin Stephan (Rhineland-Palatinate) Julius Butenschön (Hesse) Constantin Kolb (Hamburg) Silas Kuschla (Bremen (state)) — (Schleswig-Holstein) Frederik von Hartwig	Team Bulls (GSM); Team2Beat STEVENS Racing Team - Cross	
29 December 2024	(Germany) Bundesliga 13, Vechta	NE	Luca Harter (GER)	Peter Pane Nagel CX Team	

=== Great Britain ===
Date	Course	Class	Winner	Team	References
6 October 2024	(United Kingdom) National Trophy Series Round 1, Derby	C2	Thomas Mein (GBR)	Hope Factory Racing	
27 October 2024	(United Kingdom) National Trophy Series Round 2, South Shields	C2	Thomas Mein (GBR)	Hope Factory Racing	
17 November 2024	(United Kingdom) National Trophy Series Round 3, Paignton	C2	Thomas Mein (GBR)	Hope Factory Racing	
8 December 2024	(United Kingdom) National Trophy Series Round 4, Clanfield	C2	Cancelled		
5 January 2025	(United Kingdom) National Trophy Series Round 5, Bradford	C2	Cancelled		

=== Hungary ===
Date	Course	Class	Winner	Team	References
12 October 2024	(Hungary) Kermann IT Cyclo-Cross Challenge 1, Etyek	NE	Máté Endrédi (HUN)	GreenZone-ZKSE	
23 October 2024	(Hungary) KunCross - Cyclocross Magyar Kupa 1, Kecskemét	NE	Zsombor Tamás Takács (HUN)	MHB Bank Cycling Team	
9 November 2024	(Hungary) Velopark Cyclo-Cross - Cyclocross Magyar Kupa 2, Debrecen	C2	Barnabás Vas (HUN)	Cube-Csömör	
10 November 2024	(Hungary) Velopark Cyclo-Cross - Cyclocross Magyar Kupa 3, Debrecen	C2	Barnabás Vas (HUN)	Cube-Csömör	
23 November 2024	(Hungary) Kermann IT Cyclo-Cross Challenge 2, Újbuda	NE	Bence Darányi (HUN)	KTM Team Hungary	
24 November 2024	(Hungary) Velopark Cyclo-Cross - Cyclocross Magyar Kupa 4, Újbuda	NE	Zsolt Bùr (HUN)	Vialand Racing Team	
8 December 2024	(Hungary) Velopark Cyclo-Cross - Cyclocross Magyar Kupa 5, Siklós	NE	Bence Darányi (HUN)	KTM Team Hungary	
28 December 2024	(Hungary) Kermann IT Cyclo-Cross Challenge 3, Kiskunlacháza	NE	Benedek Kiss (HUN)		

=== Ireland ===
Date	Course	Class	Winner	Team	References
6 October 2024	(Republic of Ireland) Cyclo-cross National Series #1, Belfast	NE	Tadhg Killeen (IRL)	Kilcullen Cycling Club Murphy Geospacia	
27 October 2024	(Republic of Ireland) Cyclo-cross National Series #2, Clonbur	NE	Tadhg Killeen (IRL)	Kilcullen Cycling Club Murphy Geospacia	
24 November 2024	(Republic of Ireland) Cyclo-cross National Series #3, Thurles	NE	Dean Harvey (IRL)	Trinity Racing	
5 January 2025	(Republic of Ireland) Cyclo-cross National Series #4, Jenkinstown	NE	Dean Harvey (IRL)	Trinity Racing	

=== Italy ===
Date	Course	Class	Winner	Team	References
29 September 2024	(Italy) GP Centro Corridomnia – #1 Giro Regioni CX, Corridonia	NE	Samuele Scappini (ITA)	Team Cingolani	
6 October 2024	(Italy) 2° GP Citta' Di Tarvisio – #2 Giro Regioni CX, Tarvisio	C2	Gioele Bertolini (ITA)	FAS Airport Services - Guerciotti	
13 October 2024	(Italy) CX Rivellino – #3 Giro Regioni CX, Osoppo	C2	Gioele Bertolini (ITA)	FAS Airport Services - Guerciotti	
3 November 2024	(Italy) GP Val Fontanabuona – #4 Giro Regioni CX, Genova	NC	Tommaso Ferri (ITA)	FAS Airport Services - Guerciotti	
9 November 2024	(Italy) 3° Gran Premio Città di Cantoira – #5 Giro Regioni CX, Cantoira	NC	Antonio Folcarelli (ITA)	Race Mountain Folcarelli Team	
22 December 2024	(Italy) 3° GP Caroli Hotels – #6 Giro Regioni CX, Gallipoli	NC	Antonio Folcarelli (ITA)	Race Mountain Folcarelli Team	

=== Japan ===
Date	Course	Class	Winner	Team	References
6 October 2024	(Japan) Ibaraki Cyclocross Tsuchiura Stage, Tsuchiura	NE	Tatsuumi Soejima (JPN)	Osaka Sangyo University	
27 October 2024	(Japan) Tohoku Cyclocross Series 2024-2025 Crossing Round, Watari	NE	Toki Sawada (JPN)	Utsunomiya Blitzen	
3 November 2024	(Japan) Gotemba Cyclocross Supported by Shonan CX, Gotemba	NE	Tatsuumi Soejima (JPN)	Osaka Sangyo University	
10 November 2024	(Japan) Makuhari Cross 24-25, Chiba	NE	Tatsuumi Soejima (JPN)	Osaka Sangyo University	
17 November 2024	(Japan) Kansai Cyclocross Biwako Grand Prix, Kusatsu	NE/C2	Hijiri Oda (JPN)	Yowamushi Pedal Cycling Team	
23–24 November 2024	(Japan) Tokai Cyclocross Round 2 Wild Nature Plaza, Inazawa	NE	Tatsuumi Soejima (JPN)	Osaka Sangyo University	
1 December 2024	(Japan) Matsubushi Cyclocross, Matsubushi	NE	Hijiri Oda (JPN)	Yowamushi Pedal Cycling Team	
19 January 2025	(Japan) Zaousama Cup Tohoku Cyclocross 2025, Miyagi Prefecture	NC	Matsumoto Kazunari (JPN)	W.V.OTA	
2 February 2025	(Japan) Yamaguchi Cyclocross, Yamaguchi	NC	Gosse van der Meer (NED)	Atari Maeda Racing	
8–9 February 2025	(Japan) Yowamushi Pedal x Champion System CYCLOCROSS TOKYO 2025, Tokyo	NC	Hijiri Oda (JPN)	Yowamushi Pedal Cycling Team	

=== Lithuania ===
Date	Course	Class	Winner	Team	References
8 September 2024	(Lithuania) Velo CX Phase I, Vilnius	NE	Venantas Lašinis (LTU)	Energus Cycling Team	
21 September 2024	(Lithuania) Velo CX Phase II, Vilnius	NE	Venantas Lašinis (LTU)	Energus Cycling Team	
6 October 2024	(Lithuania) Velo CX Phase III, Vilnius	NE	Venantas Lašinis (LTU)	Energus Cycling Team	
20 October 2024	(Lithuania) Velo CX Phase IV, Utena	NC	Venantas Lašinis (LTU)	Energus Cycling Team	
27 October 2024	(Lithuania) Velo CX Phase V, Vilnius	NC	Venantas Lašinis (LTU)	Energus Cycling Team	

=== Luxembourg ===
Date	Course	Class	Winner	Team	References
28 September 2024	(Luxembourg) Urban Night Cross – #1 Skoda Cup CX, Kayl	NE	Timothé Gabriel (FRA)	VC Unité Schwenheim	
5 October 2024	(Luxembourg) Cyclo-Cross à Schouweiler, Schouweiler	NE	Kilian Moreels (BEL)	Cyclis - Van den Plas Cycling Team	
13 October 2024	(Luxembourg) Festival du Cyclo-Cross "Memorial Claude Michely" – #2 Skoda Cup CX, Kayl	NE	Timothé Gabriel (FRA)	VC Unité Schwenheim	
20 October 2024	(Luxembourg) Cyclo Cross régional / UC Munnerëfer Velosfrënn – #3 Skoda Cup CX, Mondorf-les-Bains	NE	Ken Conter (LUX)	Team Snooze	
27 October 2024	(Luxembourg) Grand Prix de la Commune de Contern – #4 Skoda Cup CX, Contern	C2/NE	Timothé Gabriel (FRA)	VC Unité Schwenheim	
3 November 2024	(Luxembourg) Festival Cyclo-Cross Jos Bausch / VF Gusty Bruch, Brouch	NE	Noa Berton (LUX)	Cycling Team Toproad Roeserbann	
10 November 2024	Team Snoooze Cyclocross, Luxembourg City	NE	Cancelled		
16 November 2024	(Luxembourg) 2eme GP de l'Armée Cyclo-Cross Interrégional / Team Toproad – #5 Skoda Cup CX, Diekirch	NE	Loïc Bettendorff (LUX)	CT Atertdaul/Global 6 United	
17 November 2024	(Luxembourg) Cyclo-Cross Régional / LG Belvaux, Belvaux	NE	Loïc Bettendorff (LUX)	CT Atertdaul/Global 6 United	
24 November 2024	(Luxembourg) Festival du Cyclo-Cross (Manche Skoda Cross Cup) SaF Zeisseng – #6 Skoda Cup CX, Leudelange	NE	Loïc Bettendorff (LUX)	CT Atertdaul/Global 6 United	
1 December 2024	(Luxembourg) LP 07 Schifflange – #7 Skoda Cup CX, Schifflange	NE	Elio Clarysse (BEL)	C.T. Keukens Buysse Knesselare VZW	
8 December 2024	(Luxembourg) VV Tooltime – #8 Skoda Cup CX, Préizerdaul	NE	Loïc Bettendorff (LUX)	CT Atertdaul/Global 6 United	
15 December 2024	(Luxembourg) UCN Ettelbruck – #9 Skoda Cup CX, Ettelbruck	NE	Elio Clarysse (BEL)	C.T. Keukens Buysse Knesselare VZW	
1 January 2025	(Luxembourg) UC Pétange – #10 Skoda Cup CX, Pétange	C2/NE	Lander Loockx (BEL)	Unibet Tietema Rockets	
5 January 2025	(Luxembourg) LG Alzingen – #11 Skoda Cup CX, Alzingen	NE	Ken Conter (LUX)	Team Snooze	
19 January 2025	(Luxembourg) VC Mamerdall – #12 Skoda Cup CX, Mamer	NE	Cancelled		

=== Netherlands ===
Date	Course	Class	Winner	Team	References
15 September 2024	(Netherlands) Kleeberg Cross Day 2, Mechelen	C2	Jens Adams (BEL)	Athletes for Hope	
19 October 2024	(Netherlands) Helmcross, Helmond	NE	Klaas Groenen (NED)	COERS Cycling Club	
19 October 2024	(Netherlands) RK veldrijden Zuid combi met Helmcross, Helmond	NE	Klaas Groenen (NED)	COERS Cycling Club	
22 October 2024	(Netherlands) Kiremko Nacht Van Woerden, Woerden	C2	Lars van der Haar (NED)	Baloise–Trek Lions	
The Exact Cross #3
2 November 2024	(Netherlands) 10e Nationale Veldrit van Rhenen, Rhenen	NC	Remon Delnoije (NED)	WILVO Group - TWC De Kempen	
9 November 2024	(Netherlands) Internationale Cyclo-Cross Rucphen, Rucphen	C2	Felipe Orts (ESP)	Ridley Racing Team	
10 November 2024	(Netherlands) VAM-berg Cross Wijster, Wijster	C2	Arne Baers (BEL)	Lotto–Dstny Development Team	
16–17 November 2024	(Netherlands) Nationale Veldrit Almelo, Almelo	NE	Yäel Plas (NED)	MBC Bar End	
23 November 2024	(Netherlands) Janet Memorial Veldrit van Hilversum, Laren	NE	Ingmar Uytdewilligen (BEL)		
1 December 2024	(Netherlands) De Bultcross Leiden tevens Regiokampioenschap West, Leiden	NE	Thomas Verheyen (BEL)		
1 December 2024	(Netherlands) Regiokampioenschap Veldrijden Regio West, Leiden	NE	—	—	
7 December 2024	(Netherlands) 43e Nationale Veldrit van Amersfoort, Amersfoort	NE	Yaël Plas (NED)	MBC Bar End	
7 December 2024	(Netherlands) Regiokampioenschap regio Midden-Oost, Amersfoort	NE	Yaël Plas (NED)	MBC Bar End	
14 December 2024	(Netherlands) Nationale Cross Gerrit Pluimers sr Enter, Enter	NE	Nauk ten Thije (NED)	JEGG - DJR Academy	
14 December 2024	(Netherlands) REGIO KAMPIOENSCHAPPEN NOORD + Nationale Cross Gerrit Pluimers sr Enter, Enter	NE	Mart Spijker (NED)	AWV de Zwaluwen	
15 December 2024	(Netherlands) Nationaal veldrit Nijverdal, Nijverdal	NE	Rens Teunissen van Manen (NED)	RETO	
22 December 2024	(Netherlands) APW Auto's Veldrit van Reusel, Reusel	NE	Mathijs Wuyts (BEL)		
5 January 2025	(Netherlands) 20e Kasteelcross Vorden, Vorden	NE	Jesse Kramer (NED)	WILVO Group - TWC de Kempen	
19 January 2025	(Netherlands) Nationale Cyclo Cross Huijbergen, Huijbergen	NE	Ingmar Uytdewilligen (BEL)		

=== Norway ===
Date	Course	Class	Winner	Team	References
28 September 2024	(Norway) NC Sykkelkross I, Lillehammer	NC	Ole Sigurd Rekdahl (NOR)	Halden CK	
29 September 2024	(Norway) NC Sykkelkross II, Lillehammer	NC	Ole Sigurd Rekdahl (NOR)	Halden CK	
12 October 2024	(Norway) NC Sykkelkross III, Asker	NC	Ole Sigurd Rekdahl (NOR)	Halden CK	
13 October 2024	(Norway) NC Sykkelkross IV, Asker	NC	Ole Sigurd Rekdahl (NOR)	Halden CK	
19 October 2024	(Norway) NC Sykkelkross V, Oslo	NC	Mats Tubaas Glende (NOR)	Soon CK	
20 October 2024	(Norway) NC Sykkelkross VI, Oslo	NC	Martin E. Farstadvoll (NOR)	IF Frøy	
26 October 2024	(Norway) NC Sykkelkross VII, Skien	NC	Preben Brønstad (NOR)	Raufoss & Gjøvik SK	
27 October 2024	(Norway) NC Sykkelkross VIII, Skien	NC	Thomas Rem (NOR)	IK Hero	
2 November 2024	(Norway) NC Sykkelkross IX, Drammen	NC	Sebastian Veslum (NOR)	Asker CK	
3 November 2024	(Norway) NC Sykkelkross X, Drammen	NC	Ole Sigurd Rekdahl (NOR)	Halden CK	

=== Poland ===
Date	Course	Class	Winner	Team	References
19 October 2024	(Poland) Odersky Pohar, Gościęcin	NC	Brajan Świder (POL)	Phoenix Cycling Team	
20 October 2024	(Poland) Puchar Polski, Memoriał Mieczysława Godzwona, Kluczbork	NC	Brajan Świder (POL)	Phoenix Cycling Team	
26 October 2024	(Poland) Ogólnopolski Wyścig w Kolarstwie Przełajowym o Puchar Burmistrza Miasta Słubice, Słubice	NC	Bartosz Mikler (POL)	Victoria Jarocin	
27 October 2024	(Poland) Mistrzostwa Polski LZS, Słubice	NC	Ksawier Garnek (POL)	UKS Krupiński Suszec	
9 November 2024	(Poland) Memoriał Mieczysława Brzezińskiego, Zalesie Górne	NC	Szymon Pomian (POL)	Mazowsze Serce Polski	
10 November 2024	(Poland) XXVIII Memoriał Trenera Edwarda Pelki Puchar Burmistrza Miasta i Gminy Szczekociny Jacka Lipy, Szczekociny	NC	Artur Sowiński (POL)	Voster Team	
11 November 2024	(Poland) XLVI Międzynarodowy Wyścig w Kolarstwie Przełajowym Pod Patronatem Burmistrza Gminy i Miasta Koziegłowy Jacka Ślęczki w ramach obchodów Święta Niepodległości Polski, Szczekociny	NC	Ksawier Garnek (POL)	UKS Krupiński Suszec	
16 November 2024	(Poland) Owocowy Przelaj - Laskowice Pomorskie, Laskowice	NC/C2	Ferre Geeraerts (BEL)	Basso Team Flanders	
17 November 2024	(Poland) Dalej Na Pólnoc Rowerem Się Nie Da Wladyslawowo-Cetniewo, Władysławowo	NC/C2	Silas Köch (GER)	Peter Pane Nagel CX Team	
23 November 2024	(Poland) Ogólnopolski Wyścig w Kolarstwie przełajowym, Koźminek	NC	Brajan Świder (POL)	Phoenix Cycling Team	
24 November 2024	(Poland) V Ogólnopolski Wyścig w Kolarstwie Przełajowym „Moskava Cyclocross” O Puchar Burmistrza Miasta Środa Wielkopolska, Środa Wielkopolska	NC	Brajan Świder (POL)	Phoenix Cycling Team	
30 November 2024	(Poland) Ogólnopolski Wyścig w Kolarstwie Przełajowym, Turawa	NC	Brajan Świder (POL)	Phoenix Cycling Team	
1 December 2024	(Poland) Bryksy Cross Gościęcin, Gościęcin	NC/C2	Marek Konwa (POL)	TJ Auto Škoda	
7 December 2024	(Poland) Puchar Polski ku czci Hetmana Stefana Czarneckiego - wyścig o Puchar Burmistrza Włoszczowy Grzegorza Dziubka, Włoszczowa	NC	Brajan Świder (POL)	Phoenix Cycling Team	
8 December 2024	(Poland) Ogólnopolski Wyścig w Kolarstwie Przełajowym „Cyclocross Sławno”, Sławno	NC	Brajan Świder (POL)	Phoenix Cycling Team	
14 December 2024	(Poland) CX Włoszakowice „Cześć i Chwała Zwycięzcom” Dla Uczczenia 106 Rocznicy Powstania Wielkopolskiego, Włoszakowice	NC	Brajan Świder (POL)	Phoenix Cycling Team	
15 December 2024	(Poland) Lubuskie Warte Zachodu - Zielona Góra, Zielona Góra	NC/C2	Marek Konwa (POL)	TJ Auto Škoda	
21 December 2024	(Poland) Ogólnopolski Wyścig w Kolarstwie Przełajowym o Puchar Marszałka woj. mazowieckiego, Warsaw	NC			
22 December 2024	(Poland) Międzynarodowy Wyścig w Kolarstwie Przełajowym o Puchar Marszalka woj. mazowieckiego, Warsaw	NC			
28 December 2024	(Poland) Ogólnopolski Wyścig w Kolarstwie Przełajowym o Puchar Prezydenta Ełku, Ełk	NC	Filip Helta (POL)	KTM SGR MTB Team	
29 December 2024	(Poland) Puchar Polski w Kolarstwie Przełajowym Ełk 2024, Ełk	NC	Karol Ostaszewski (POL)	JBG-2 Team	

=== Portugal ===
Date	Course	Class	Winner	Team	References
20 October 2024	1ª Taça de Portugal de Ciclocrosse, Vouzela	C2/NC	Mario Junquera (ESP)	Unicaja Banco - Gijón	
27 October 2024	2ª Taça de Portugal de Ciclocrosse, Melgaço	C1/NC	Kevin Suárez (ESP)	Nesta - MMR CX Team	
23 November 2024	3ª Taça de Portugal de Ciclocrosse, Ansião	NC	Rafael Sousa (POR)	Guilhabreu MTB Team	
24 November 2024	4ª Taça de Portugal de Ciclocrosse, Ílhavo	NC	Rafael Sousa (POR)	Guilhabreu MTB Team	
8 December 2024	5ª Taça de Portugal de Ciclocrosse, Vila Real	NC	Mário Costa (POR)	AXPO / FirstBike Team / Vila do Conde	

=== Romania ===
Date	Course	Class	Winner	Team	References
19 October 2024	(Romania) Velocrosul Castanilor / CR CX #1, Florești	NC	József Attila Málnási (ROU)	ACS Velocitas	
26 October 2024	(Romania) Romanian CX Cup #2, Vatra Dornei	NC/CU	József Attila Málnási (ROU)	ACS Velocitas	
2 November 2024	(Romania) Arad CXCup / CR CX #3, Arad	NC	József Attila Málnási (ROU)	ACS Velocitas	
9 November 2024	(Romania) Lunca Timișului Continental Anvelope CX / CR CX #4, Timișoara	C1	Zsombor Tamás Takács (HUN)		
1 December 2024	(Romania) Porumbacu CX Race / CR CX #5, Porumbacu de Sus	NC	Bogdan Duca (ROU)	Bikexpert Superbet Racing Team	
7 December 2024	(Romania) Cluj Winter Race / CR CX #6, Cluj Napoca	NC	József Attila Málnási (ROU)	ACS Velocitas	

=== Russia ===
Date	Course	Class	Winner	Team	References
23–24 November 2024	(Russia) FVSR International cyclo-cross series #1, Arkhipo-Osipovka	NC	(Russia) Timofei Ivanov		
30 November – 1 December 2024	(Russia) FVSR International cyclo-cross series #2, Arkhipo-Osipovka	NC	(Russia) Timofei Ivanov		
14–15 December 2024	(Russia) FVSR International cyclo-cross series #3, Maykop	NC	(Russia) Timofei Ivanov		
21–22 December 2024	(Russia) FVSR International cyclo-cross series #4, Maykop	NC	(Russia) Timofei Ivanov		
18–19 January 2025	(Russia) FVSR International cyclo-cross series #5, Arkhipo-Osipovka	NC	(Russia) Timofei Ivanov		
1–2 March 2025	(Russia) FVSR International cyclo-cross series #6, Psebay	NC			

=== Slovakia ===
Date	Course	Class	Winner	Team	References
13 October 2024	(Slovakia) Grand Prix Levoča – Slovak Cup #1, Levoča	C2	Marek Konwa (POL)	TJ Auto Škoda MB	
20 October 2024	(Slovakia) Grand Prix Trnava – Slovak Cup #2, Trnava	C2	Marek Konwa (POL)	TJ Auto Škoda MB	
9 November 2024	(Slovakia) Grand Prix Topoľčianky – Slovak Cup #3, Topoľčianky	C2	Matej Ulík (SVK)		
10 November 2024	(Slovakia) Grand Prix Topoľčianky – Slovak Cup #4, Topoľčianky	C2	Marek Konwa (POL)	TJ Auto Škoda MB	
17 November 2024	(Slovakia) Slovak Cup #5 (part of European Cup), Šamorín	NC/C2	Václav Ježek (CZE)	Brilon Racing Team MB	
24 November 2024	(Slovakia) Grand Prix Podbrezová – Slovak Cup #7, Podbrezová	NC/C2	Marek Konwa (POL)	TJ Auto Škoda MB	

=== Slovenia (Winter League) ===
Date	Course	Class	Winner	Team	References
17 November 2024	(Slovenia) 1. Ciklokros Polzela – Winter League #1, Polzela	NE	Filip Utranker (SVN)		
1 December 2024	(Slovenia) Ciklokros Straža – Winter League #2, Straža	NE	Mihael Štajnar (SVN)	Sava Kranj Cycling	
8 December 2024	(Slovenia) Ciklokros za Pokal občine Tišina – Winter League #3, Tišina	NE	Mihael Štajnar (SVN)		
26 December 2024	(Slovenia) Ciklokros Ljubljana – Winter League #4, Ljubljana	NE	Mihael Štajnar (SVN)		

=== Spain ===
Date	Course	Class	Winner	Team	References
6 October 2024	(Spain) Trofeo Villa de Gijón – Spanish Cup #1, Gijón	C2	Kevin Suárez (ESP)	Nesta - MMR CX Team	
12 October 2024	(Spain) Ciclocross Internacional Xaxancx – Spanish Cup #2, Pontevedra	C2	Kevin Suárez (ESP)	Nesta - MMR CX Team	
26 October 2024	(Spain) G.P KH7 - Dark Cross Les Franqueses – Spanish Cup #3, Les Franqueses del Vallès	C2	Jofre Cullell (ESP)	BH Coloma Team	
10 November 2024	(Spain) Ciclocross Internacional de Karrantza – Spanish Cup #4, Karrantza	C2	Kevin Suárez (ESP)	Nesta - MMR CX Team	
16 November 2024	(Spain) Ciclocros Internacional Ciudad de Tarancón – Spanish Cup #5, Tarancón	C2	Kevin Suárez (ESP)	Nesta - MMR CX Team	
17 November 2024	(Spain) Ciclocross Ciudad de Alcobendas - Enbici – Spanish Cup #6, Alcobendas	C2	Kevin Suárez (ESP)	Nesta - MMR CX Team	
14 December 2024	(Spain) Ciclocross Internacional Ciutat de Xàtiva – Spanish Cup #7, Xàtiva	C2	Kevin Suárez (ESP)	Nesta - MMR CX Team	
15 December 2024	(Spain) Cyclocross Internacional Ciudad de Valencia – Spanish Cup #8, Valencia	C2	cancelled		

=== Sweden ===
Date	Course	Class	Winner	Team	References
5 October 2024	(Sweden) Hagströmska CX SWE-CUP #1 2024, Falun	NC	Filip Mård (SWE)	Länna Sport CK	
6 October 2024	(Sweden) Hagströmska CX SWE-CUP #2 2024, Falun	NC	Filip Mård (SWE)	Länna Sport CK	
12 October 2024	(Sweden) Fristads Cyclocross Weekend Day 1 – SWE Cup #3, Täby	C2/NC	Clément Horny (BEL)	BH-Wallonie MTB Team	
13 October 2024	(Sweden) Fristads Cyclocross Weekend Day 2 – SWE Cup #4, Täby	C2/NC	Clément Horny (BEL)	BH-Wallonie MTB Team	
16 October 2024	(Sweden) Hagströmska CX, Falun	C2/NC	Clément Horny (BEL)	BH-Wallonie MTB Team	
19 October 2024	(Sweden) Varberg Cyclocross Day 1 – SWE Cup #5, Varberg	C2/NC	Daniel Weis Nielsen (DEN)	Decathlon–AG2R La Mondiale Development Team	
20 October 2024	(Sweden) Varberg Cyclocross Day 2 – SWE Cup #6, Varberg	C2/NC	Daniel Weis Nielsen (DEN)	Decathlon–AG2R La Mondiale Development Team	
9 November 2024	(Sweden) Malmö CX SWE-CUP #7, Malmö	NC	Simon Marquardsen (DEN)	Næstved Bicycle Club	
10 November 2024	(Sweden) Malmö CX SWE-CUP #8, Malmö	NC	Simon Marquardsen (DEN)	Næstved Bicycle Club	

==== Switzerland ====
Date	Course	Class	Winner	Team	References
13 October 2024	(Switzerland) 63. Internationales Radquer Steinmaur / Swiss Cyclocross Cup #1, Steinmaur	C2	Lander Loockx (BEL)	TDT–Unibet Cycling Team	
20 October 2024	(Switzerland) AlperoseQuer Schneisingen / Swiss Cyclocross Cup #2, Schneisingen	C2	Dario Lillo (SUI)	Giant Factory Offroad-Racing Team	
27 October 2024	(Switzerland) 9. Radquer Mettmenstetten / Swiss Cyclocross Cup #3, Mettmenstetten	C2	Dario Lillo (SUI)	Giant Factory Offroad-Racing Team	
10 November 2024	(Switzerland) Radquer Hittnau / Swiss Cyclocross Cup #4, Hittnau	C2	Loris Rouiller (SUI)	Heizomat Radteam	
17–18 November 2024	(Switzerland) Crossquer Dielsdorf / Swiss Cyclocross Cup #5, Dielsdorf	C2	Loris Rouiller (SUI)	Heizomat Radteam	

=== United States ===
Date	Course	Class	Winner	Team	References
14 September 2024	(United States) Trek USCX #1 - Virginia's Blue Ridge Go Cross, Roanoke	C1	Andrew Strohmeyer (USA)	CXD Trek Bikes	
15 September 2024	(United States) Trek USCX #2 - Virginia's Blue Ridge Go Cross, Roanoke	C2	Andrew Strohmeyer (USA)	CXD Trek Bikes	
21 September 2024	(United States) Trek USCX #3 - Rochester Cyclocross, Rochester	C1	Andrew Strohmeyer (USA)	CXD Trek Bikes	
22 September 2024	(United States) Trek USCX #4 - Rochester Cyclocross, Rochester	C2	Andrew Strohmeyer (USA)	CXD Trek Bikes	
28 September 2024	(United States) Trek USCX #5 - Charm City Cross, Baltimore	C1	Andrew Strohmeyer (USA)	CXD Trek Bikes	
29 September 2024	(United States) Trek USCX #6 - Charm City Cross, Baltimore	C2	Eric Brunner (USA)	Competitive Edge Racing	
5 October 2024	(United States) Trek USCX #7 - Trek CX Cup, Waterloo	C1	Kerry Werner (USA)	Groove Subaru Cycling Team	
6 October 2024	(United States) Trek USCX #8 - Trek CX Cup, Waterloo	C2	Andrew Strohmeyer (USA)	CXD Trek Bikes	

== Women's Elite ==
=== Events ===
==== August ====
Date	Course	Class	Winner	Team	References
18 August 2024	(Australia) Ballarat XC, Ballarat	C2	Izzy Flint (AUS)		

==== September ====
Date	Course	Class	Winner	Team	References
7 September 2024	(United States) Englewood Open CX Day 1, Fall River	C2	Sidney McGill (CAN)		
8 September 2024	(United States) Englewood Open CX Day 2, Fall River	C2	Sidney McGill (CAN)		
14 September 2024	(United Kingdom) Hope Supercross Round 1, Tong	C2	Laura Verdonschot (BEL)	Deceuster Bonache CT	
15 September 2024	(United Kingdom) Hope Supercross Round 2, Tong	C2	Laura Verdonschot (BEL)	Deceuster Bonache CT	
18 September 2024	(United Kingdom) Hope Supercross Round 3, Wyke	C2	Laura Verdonschot (BEL)	Deceuster Bonache CT	
21 September 2024	(United Kingdom) Hope Supercross Round 4, Wyke	C2	Laura Verdonschot (BEL)	Deceuster Bonache CT	
22 September 2024	(Switzerland) Radcross Illnau, Illnau-Effretikon	C1	Léa Stern (SUI)	Lyon Sprint Evolution	

==== October ====
Date	Course	Class	Winner	Team	References
6 October 2024	(Czech Republic) Grand Prix Ostrava, Ostrava	C1	Alicia Franck (BEL)	De Ceuster Bouwpunt	
6 October 2024	(France) Brumath Bike Festival, Brumath	C1	Leonie Bentveld (NED)	Pauwels Sauzen–Bingoal	
12 October 2024	(United States) Major Taylor Cross Cup Day 1, Indianapolis	C2	Caroline Mani (FRA)	Groove Subaru Cycling Team	
13 October 2024	(Republic of Ireland) Verge Cross Clonmel, Clonmel	C2	Greta Lawless (IRL)	Team WORC	
13 October 2024	(United States) Major Taylor Cross Cup Day 2, Indianapolis	C2	Caroline Mani (FRA)	Groove Subaru Cycling Team	
17 October 2024	(Belgium) Kermiscross, Ardooie	C2	Ceylin del Carmen Alvarado (NED)	Fenix–Deceuninck	
19 October 2024	(Italy) #1 Master Cross – GP Internazionale CX Citta' di Jesolo, Jesolo	C2	Rebecca Gariboldi (ITA)	Ale Cycling Team	
19 October 2024	(United States) Kings CX Day 1, Mason	C1	Maghalie Rochette (CAN)	Canyon//SRAM	
20 October 2024	(United States) Kings CX Day 2, Mason	C2	Maghalie Rochette (CAN)	Canyon//SRAM	
26 October 2024	(Denmark) Party Prijs CK Aarhus Day 1, Aarhus	C2	Julie Brouwers (BEL)	Charles Liégeois Roastery CX	
26 October 2024	(Italy) #2 Master Cross – International Cyclocross Increa Brugherio, Brugherio	C1	Carlotta Borello (ITA)	Team Cingolani	
26 October 2024	(United States) Really Rad Festival of Cyclocross Day 1, Falmouth	C1	Maghalie Rochette (CAN)	Canyon//SRAM	
27 October 2024	(Denmark) Party Prijs CK Aarhus Day 2, Aarhus	C2	Julie Brouwers (BEL)	Charles Liégeois Roastery CX	
27 October 2024	(Italy) Grand Prix Cicli Francesconi Salvirola, Salvirola	C2	Carlotta Borello (ITA)	Team Cingolani	
27 October 2024	(United States) Really Rad Festival of Cyclocross Day 2, Falmouth	C2	Maghalie Rochette (CAN)	Canyon//SRAM	

==== November ====
Date	Course	Class	Winner	Team	References
1 November 2024	(France) Cyclo-cross International de Dijon, Dijon	C2	Amandine Vidon (FRA)	Ardennes Cross Team Gecibat	
1 November 2024	(Italy) Trofeo Citta' di Firenze, San Piero a Sieve	C2	Carlotta Borello (ITA)	Team Cingolani	
2 November 2024	(France) Rivabellacross, Ouistreham	C2	Julie Brouwers (BEL)	Charles Liégeois Roastery CX	
2 November 2024	(United States) Thunder Cross, Missoula	C2	Isabella Holmgren (CAN)	Lidl–Trek	
10 November 2024	(Italy) Turin International Cyclocross, Turin	C2	Carlotta Borello (ITA)	Team Cingolani	
16 November 2024	(France) Cyclo-cross Gernelle, Gernelle	C2	Hélène Clauzel (FRA)	Van Rysel Cross Team	
16 November 2024	(United States) Nash Dash Day 1, Hampton	C2	Caroline Mani (FRA)	Groove Subaru Cycling Team	
17 November 2024	(United States) Nash Dash Day 2, Hampton	C2	Caroline Mani (FRA)	Groove Subaru Cycling Team	
17 November 2024	(Canada) Cyclo-cross de Lévis, Lévis	C2	Maghalie Rochette (CAN)	Canyon//SRAM	
23 November 2024	(United States) North Carolina Grand Prix Day 1, Hendersonville	C2	Vida Lopez de San Roman (USA)	Trek Bear National Team	
24 November 2024	(United States) North Carolina Grand Prix Day 2, Hendersonville	C2	Vida Lopez de San Roman (USA)	Trek Bear National Team	
30 November 2024	(Spain) Trofeo Ciclo-Cross Rafa Valls Cocentaina, Cocentaina	C2	Léa Stern (SUI)	Lyon Sprint Evolution	

==== December ====
Date	Course	Class	Winner	Team	References
1 December 2024	(Italy) Gran Premio Guerciotti Brembate, Brembate	C2	Rebecca Gariboldi (ITA)	Ale Cycling Team	
7 December 2024	(Spain) Ciclocross Internacional Ciudad de Tarazona, Tarazona	C2	Sara Cueto Vega (ESP)	Unicaja - Gijon	
8 December 2024	(Spain) Ziklo Kross Igorre, Igorre	C2	Noémie Garnier (FRA)	Team Guevel Roadborn	
24 December	(Italy) Cross Della Vigilia Albiate, Albiate	C2	Cancelled		

==== January ====
Date	Course	Class	Winner	Team	References
4 January 2025	(Spain) Amurrioko Ziklo-Krossa, Amurrio	C2	Sofia Rodríguez (ESP)	Nesta - MMR CX Team	
6 January 2025	(Italy) Memorial Romano Scotti Follonica 2025, Follonica	C2	Cancelled		
13 January 2025	(Belgium) Nationale Cyclo-Cross Otegem, Otegem	C2	Sanne Cant (BEL)	Crelan - Corendon	

==== February ====
Date	Course	Class	Winner	Team	References
23 February 2025	(Belgium) Sluitingsprijs Oostmalle, Oostmalle	C1	Lucinda Brand (NED)	Baloise Glowi Lions	

== 2024–25 UCI Cyclo-cross World Cup ==
Date	Course	Class	Winner	Team	References
24 November 2024	(Belgium) World Cup #1, Antwerpen	CDM	Fem van Empel (NED)	Visma–Lease a Bike	
1 December 2024	(Republic of Ireland) World Cup #2, Dublin	CDM	Lucinda Brand (NED)	Baloise–Trek Lions	
8 December 2024	(Italy) World Cup #3, Cabras	CDM	Cancelled		
15 December 2024	(Belgium) World Cup #4, Namur	CDM	Ceylin del Carmen Alvarado (NED)	Fenix–Deceuninck	
21 December 2024	(Netherlands) World Cup #5, Hulst	CDM	Marie Schreiber (LUX)	Team SD Worx–Protime	
22 December 2024	(Belgium) World Cup #6, Zonhoven	CDM	Ceylin del Carmen Alvarado (NED)	Fenix–Deceuninck	
26 December 2024	(Belgium) World Cup #7, Gavere	CDM	Fem van Empel (NED)	Visma–Lease a Bike	
29 December 2024	(France) World Cup #8, Besançon	CDM	Fem van Empel (NED)	Visma–Lease a Bike	
5 January 2025	(Belgium) World Cup #9, Dendermonde	CDM	Lucinda Brand (NED)	Baloise Glowi Lions	
19 January 2025	(Spain) World Cup #10, Benidorm	CDM	Fem van Empel (NED)	Visma–Lease a Bike	
25 January 2025	(Belgium) World Cup #11, Maasmechelen	CDM	Blanka Vas (HUN)	Team SD Worx–Protime	
26 January 2025	(Netherlands) World Cup #12, Hoogerheide	CDM	Lucinda Brand (NED)	Baloise Glowi Lions	

== 2024–25 Cyclo-cross Superprestige ==
Date	Course	Class	Winner	Team	References
20 October 2024	(Belgium) Superprestige #1, Cyclo-cross Ruddervoorde, Oostkamp	C1	Ceylin del Carmen Alvarado (NED)	Fenix–Deceuninck	
27 October 2024	(Belgium) Superprestige #2, Druivencross, Overijse	C1	Lucinda Brand (NED)	Baloise–Trek Lions	
11 November 2024	(Belgium) Superprestige #3, Jaarmarktcross, Niel	C1	Ceylin del Carmen Alvarado (NED)	Fenix–Deceuninck	
16 November 2024	(Belgium) Superprestige #4, Aardbeiencross, Merksplas	C1	Ceylin del Carmen Alvarado (NED)	Fenix–Deceuninck	
23 December 2024	(Belgium) Superprestige #5, Zilvermeercross, Mol	C2	Ceylin del Carmen Alvarado (NED)	Fenix–Deceuninck	
30 December 2024	(Belgium) Superprestige #6, Diegem	C1	Lucinda Brand (NED)	Baloise–Trek Lions	
4 January 2025	(Belgium) Superprestige #7, Wevelgem	C2	Lucinda Brand (NED)	Baloise Glowi Lions	
8 February 2025	(Belgium) Superprestige #8, Noordzeecross, Middelkerke	C1	Inge van der Heijden (NED)	Crelan-Corendon	

== 2024–2025 X²O Badkamers Trophy ==
Date	Course	Class	Winner	Team	References
1 November 2024	(Belgium) X²O Badkamers Trophy #1, Koppenbergcross, Oudenaarde	C1	Fem van Empel (NED)	Visma–Lease a Bike	
10 November 2024	(Belgium) X²O Badkamers Trophy #2, Rapencross, Lokeren	C2	Lucinda Brand (NED)	Baloise–Trek Lions	
17 November 2024	(Belgium) X²O Badkamers Trophy #3, Flandriencross, Hamme	C1	Ceylin del Carmen Alvarado (NED)	Fenix–Deceuninck	
14 December 2024	(Belgium) X²O Badkamers Trophy #4, Herentals	C2	Fem van Empel (NED)	Visma–Lease a Bike	
1 January 2025	(Belgium) X²O Badkamers Trophy #5, Grand Prix Sven Nys, Baal	C1	Fem van Empel (NED)	Visma–Lease a Bike	
3 January 2025	(Belgium) X²O Badkamers Trophy #6, Duinencross, Koksijde	C1	Puck Pieterse (NED)	Fenix–Deceuninck	
9 February 2025	(Belgium) X²O Badkamers Trophy #7, Krawatencross, Lille	C1	Lucinda Brand (NED)	Baloise Glowi Lions	
16 February 2025	(Belgium) X²O Badkamers Trophy #8, Brussels Universities Cyclocross, Brussels	C1	Sara Casasola (ITA)	Crelan – Corendon	

== 2024–2025 Exact Cross ==
Date	Course	Class	Winner	Team	References
12 October 2024	(Belgium) Exact Cross #1, Be-Mine Cross, Beringen	C2	Fem van Empel (NED)	Visma–Lease a Bike	
19 October 2024	(Belgium) Exact Cross #2, Essen	C2	Marion Norbert-Riberolle (BEL)	Crelan - Corendon	
26 October 2024	(Belgium) Exact Cross #3, Heerde	C2	Ceylin del Carmen Alvarado (NED)	Fenix–Deceuninck	
23 November 2024	(Belgium) Exact Cross #4, Urban Cross, Kortrijk	C2	Fem van Empel (NED)	Visma–Lease a Bike	
27 December 2024	(Belgium) Exact Cross #5, Azencross, Loenhout	C1	Marion Norbert-Riberolle (BEL)	Crelan - Corendon	
5 February 2025	(Belgium) Exact Cross #6, Parkcross, Maldegem	C2	Marie Schreiber (LUX)	Team SD Worx–Protime	
15 February 2025	(Belgium) Exact Cross #7, Waaslandcross, Sint-Niklaas	C2	Lucinda Brand (NED)	Baloise Glowi Lions	

== 2024–25 UEC European Cup ==
Date	Course	Class	Winner	Team	References
19 October 2024	(Hungary) UEC European Cup #1, Debrecen	C2	Eliška Drbohlavová (CZE)	LAWI Junior Team	
20 October 2024	(Hungary) UEC European Cup #2, Debrecen	C2	Regina Bruchner (HUN)		
26 October 2024	(Romania) UEC European Cup #3, Vatra Dornei	–	Regina Bruchner (HUN)		
17 November 2024	(Slovakia) UEC European Cup #4, Šamorín	–	Viktória Chladoňová (CZE)	Climberg Sport Team	

== Women's National Cup's and Series ==
=== Australia ===
Date	Course	Class	Winner	Team	References
25 May 2024	(Australia) 2024 AusCycling CX National Series Round 1, Adelaide	NE	Katherine Hosking (AUS)	New England Mountain Bikers	
26 May 2024	(Australia) 2024 AusCycling CX National Series Round 2, Adelaide	NE	Katherine Hosking (AUS)	New England Mountain Bikers	
15 June 2024	(Australia) 2024 AusCycling CX National Series Round 3, Herston	NE	Fiona Morris (AUS)	Alpine Cycling Club	
16 June 2024	(Australia) 2024 AusCycling CX National Series Round 4, Herston	NE	Fiona Morris (AUS)	Alpine Cycling Club	
20 July 2024	(Australia) 2024 AusCycling CX National Series Round 5, Randwick	NE	Katherine Hosking (AUS)	New England Mountain Bikers	
21 July 2024	(Australia) 2024 AusCycling CX National Series Round 6, Randwick	NE	Katherine Hosking (AUS)	New England Mountain Bikers	

=== Austria ===
Date	Course	Class	Winner	Team	References
12 September 2024	(Austria) Bad Ischler Radquerfeldein, Bad Ischl	NE	Nadja Heigl (AUT)	KTM Alchemist	
5 October 2024	(Austria) Quer durchs Stadion, Pernitz	NE	Silke Mair (AUT)	URC Ried - Rad Ginzinger	
12 October 2024	(Austria) Lagerhaus GP, Korneuburg	NE	Silke Mair (AUT)	URC Ried - Rad Ginzinger	
13 October 2024	(Austria) King & Queen of Seeschlacht powered by Bikestore.cc, Langenzersdorf	NE	Nadja Heigl (AUT)	KTM Alchemist	
20 October 2024	(Austria) St. Pöltner Querfeldein im Kaiserwald, Sankt Pölten	NE	Romana Slavinec (AUT)	RC ARBÖ SK VÖEST	
26 October 2024	(Austria) Wienenergie Cyclocross Day 1, Pottendorf	NE	Romana Slavinec (AUT)	RC ARBÖ SK VÖEST	
27 October 2024	(Austria) Wienenergie Cyclocross Day 2, Pottendorf	NE	Romana Slavinec (AUT)	RC ARBÖ SK VÖEST	
3 November 2024	(Austria) Steiner Cross pb RC Ovilava, Wels	NE	Silke Mair (AUT)	URC Ried - Rad Ginzinger	
16 November 2024	(Austria) GP Ternitz, Ternitz	NE	Silke Mair (AUT)	URC Ried - Rad Ginzinger	
17 November 2024	(Austria) GP Ternitz um die Preise des ARBÖ, Ternitz	NE	Romana Slavinec (AUT)	RC ARBÖ SK VÖEST	
24 November 2024	(Austria) Radquerfeldein GP um das Sportzentrum Gunskirchen, Gunskirchen	NE	Nadja Heigl (AUT)	KTM Alchemist	
1 December 2024	(Austria) Park-Cross Böheimkirchen, Böheimkirchen	NE	Cancelled		
15 December 2024	(Austria) 2.CX-Mas Cross Gerasdorf, Gerasdorf bei Wien	NE	Nadja Heigl (AUT)	KTM Alchemist	
6 January 2025	(Austria) 3KöniXcrosS St. Pölten, Sankt Pölten	NE	Nadja Heigl (AUT)	KTM Alchemist	

=== Belgium ===
Date	Course	Class	Winner	Team	References
7 September 2024	2024 Belgium CX National Series Round 1, Londerzeel	NE	Joyce Vanderbeken (BEL)	Athletes for Hope	
8 September 2024	2024 Belgium CX National Series Round 2, Nijlen	NE	Nette Coppens (BEL)	ACROG-Tormans	
15 September 2024	2024 Belgium CX National Series Round 3, Wiekevorst	NE	Lore Sas (BEL)	ACROG-Tormans	
29 September 2024	2024 Belgium CX National Series Round 4, Kasterlee	NE	Nette Coppens (BEL)	ACROG-Tormans	
6 October 2024	2024 Belgium CX National Series Round 5, Baal	NE	Jamie de Beer (NED)	Het Snelle Wiel	
12 October 2024	2024 Belgium CX National Series Round 6, Sint-Truiden	NE	Tessa Zwaenepoel (BEL)		
19 October 2024	2024 Belgium CX National Series Round 7, Eversel	NE	Zita Peeters (BEL)	ACROG-Tormans	
20 October 2024	2024 Belgium CX National Series Round 8, Patattencross, Nossegem	NE	Joyce Vanderbeken (BEL)	Bike Advice CT	
27 October 2024	2024 Belgium CX National Series Round 9, Herenthout	NE	Lisa Maes (BEL)	Cyclocross Team MJ Wood	
3 November 2024	2024 Belgium CX National Series Round 8, Rijkevorsel	NE	Alexe De Raedemaeker (BEL)	Essec Cycling Team	
16 November 2024	2024 Belgium CX National Series Round 9, Ravestein Parkcross, Hever	NE	Lien Schampaert (BEL)	AA Drink Young Lions	
16 November 2024	2024 Belgium CX National Series Round 10, Maldegem	NE	Joyce Vanderbeken (BEL)	Bike Advice CT	
30 November 2024	2024 Belgium CX National Series Round 11, Ardooie	NE	Kim Van De Steene (BEL)	Team Never Give Up by Jolien Verschueren	
22 December 2024	2024 Belgium CX National Series Round 12, Oosterzele	NE	Shanaya Esther Schollaert (BEL)	Baloise WB Ladies	
26 December 2024	2024 Belgium CX National Series Round 13, Beernem	NE	Joyce Vanderbeken (BEL)	Bike Advice CT	
28 December 2024	2024 Belgium CX National Series Round 14, Borgloon	NE	Joyce Vanderbeken (BEL)	Bike Advice CT	
4 January 2025	2024 Belgium CX National Series Round 14, Vilvoorde	NE	Joyce Vanderbeken (BEL)	Bike Advice CT	
18 January 2025	2024 Belgium CX National Series Round 15, Gierle	NE	Joyce Vanderbeken (BEL)	Bike Advice CT	
19 January 2025	2024 Belgium CX National Series Round 15, Bekkevoort	NE	Lara Defour (BEL)	Cycling Team Jade - LDL	
26 January 2025	2024 Belgium CX National Series Round 16, Hoogstraten	NE	Meg de Bruyne (BEL)	VELOPRO - Alphamotorhomes	

=== Chile ===
Date	Course	Class	Winner	Team	References
28 April 2024	2024 Chile CX Cup 1, Pirque	NE	Daniela Rojas Meneses (CHI)		
5 May 2024	2024 Chile CX Cup 2, Pudahuel	NE	Fernanda Castro (CHI)		
18 May 2024	2024 Chile CX Cup 3, San Fernando	NE	Fernanda Castro (CHI)		
2 June 2024	2024 Chile CX Cup 4, Curacavi	NE	Verena Hörmann (CHI)		
22 June 2024	2024 Chile CX Cup 5, Valdivia	NE	Verena Hörmann (CHI)		
23 June 2024	2024 Chile CX Cup 6, Temuco	NE	Verena Hörmann (CHI)		
7 July 2024	2024 Chile CX Cup 7, Peñalolen	NE	Fernanda Castro (CHI)		
21 July 2024	2024 Chile CX Cup 8, Estacion Central	NE	Fernanda Castro (CHI)		
4 August 2024	2024 Chile CX Cup 9, Pirque	NE	Fernanda Castro (CHI)		
25 August 2024	2024 Chile CX Cup 10, Cerro Navia	NE	Verena Hörmann (CHI)		

=== Czechia ===
Date	Course	Class	Winner	Team	References
28 September 2024	(Czech Republic) 2024 HSF System Cup 1, Veselí nad Lužnicí	C2	Cancelled		
5 October 2024	(Czech Republic) 2024 HSF System Cup 2 – Grand Prix Ostrava, Ostrava	C2	Alicia Franck (BEL)	De Ceuster-Bouwpunt	
12 October 2024	(Czech Republic) 2024 HSF System Cup 3, Hlinsko	C2	Kristýna Zemanová (CZE)	Brilon Racing Team MB	
19 October 2024	(Czech Republic) 2024 HSF System Cup 4, Louny	NE	No Elite here		
20 October 2024	(Czech Republic) 2024 HSF System Cup 5, Čáslav	C2	Barbora Bukovská (CZE)	DK Bikeshop Racing Team	
26 October 2024	(Czech Republic) 2024 HSF System Cup 6, Kolín	C2	Kristýna Zemanová (CZE)	Brilon Racing Team MB	
9 November 2024	(Czech Republic) 2024 HSF System Cup 7, Plzeň	C2	Barbora Bukovská (CZE)	DK Bikeshop Racing Team	
16 November 2024	(Czech Republic) 2024 HSF System Cup 8, Rýmařov	C2	Kristýna Zemanová (CZE)	Brilon Racing Team MB	
23 November 2024	(Czech Republic) 2024 HSF System Cup 9, Mladá Boleslav	C2	Kristýna Zemanová (CZE)	Brilon Racing Team MB	
30 November 2024	(Czech Republic) 2024 HSF System Cup 10, Chýnov	NC	No Elite here		
7–8 December 2024	(Czech Republic) 2024 HSF System Cup 11, Uničov	C2	Kristýna Zemanová (CZE)	Brilon Racing Team MB	

=== Denmark ===
Date	Course	Class	Winner	Team	References
3 November 2024	(Denmark) Challenge Cross-Cup I, Roskilde	NC	Ann-Dorthe Lisbygd (DEN)	Dansk Mountainbike Klub	
10 November 2024	(Denmark) Challenge Cross-Cup II, Sorø	NC	Mille Foldager Nielsen (DEN)	Willing Able Racing	
16 November 2024	(Denmark) Challenge Cross-Cup III, Skive	NC	Ann-Dorthe Lisbygd (DEN)	Dansk Mountainbike Klub	
24 November 2024	(Denmark) Challenge Cross-Cup IV, Odense	NC	Ann-Dorthe Lisbygd (DEN)	Dansk Mountainbike Klub	
8 December 2024	(Denmark) Challenge Cross-Cup V, Ballerup	NC	Ann-Dorthe Lisbygd (DEN)	Dansk Mountainbike Klub	
15 December 2024	(Denmark) Challenge Cross-Cup VI, Ballerup	NC	Mille Foldager Nielsen (DEN)	WILLING ABLE Racing	
5 January 2024	(Denmark) Challenge Cross-Cup VII, Kalundborg	NC	Ann-Dorthe Lisbygd (DEN)	Dansk Mountainbike Klub	

=== Estonia ===
Date	Course	Class	Winner	Team	References
22 September 2024	(Estonia) Viljandi CX, Viljandi	NC	Loore Lemloch (EST)		
28 September 2024	(Estonia) Rapla CX, Rapla	NC	Mari-Liis Mõttus (EST)	Haanja Rattaklubi	
5 October 2024	(Estonia) Elva CX, Elva	NC	Mari-Liis Mõttus (EST)	Haanja Rattaklubi	
12 October 2024	(Estonia) Tallinn CX, Tallinn	NC	Mari-Liis Mõttus (EST)	Haanja Rattaklubi	
19 October 2024	(Estonia) Rakke CX, Rakke	NC	Mari-Liis Mõttus (EST)	Haanja Rattaklubi	

=== Finland ===
Date	Course	Class	Winner	Team	References
21 September 2024	(Finland) Rajamäki CX – Finnish Cup #1, Helsinki	NC	Noora Kanerva (FIN)		
29 September 2024	(Finland) Krossikommuuni Oulu – Finnish Cup #2, Kempele	NC	Suvi Kangaskokko (FIN)		
13 October 2024	(Finland) Olari CX – Finnish Cup #3, Olari	NC	Hanna Häkkinen (FIN)		
26–27 October 2024	(Finland) Tuusula CX – Finnish Cup #4, Tuusula	NC	Noora Kanerva (FIN)		
3 November 2024	(Finland) Kivikko Prestige – Finnish Cup #5, Kivikko	NC	Viivi Turpeinen (FIN)	Restore Cycling Ladies	

=== France ===
Date	Course	Class	Winner	Team	References
19 October 2024	(France) French Cup #1, Nommay	C2	Marie Schreiber (LUX)	Team SD Worx–Protime	
20 October 2024	(France) French Cup #2, Nommay	C2	Marie Schreiber (LUX)	Team SD Worx–Protime	
9 November 2024	(France) French Cup #3, Pierric	C2	Amandine Fouquenet (FRA)	Arkéa–B&B Hotels Women	
10 November 2024	(France) French Cup #4, Pierric	C2	Célia Gery (FRA)	AS Bike Racing	
23 November 2024	(France) French Cup #5, Troyes	C2	Anaïs Morichon (FRA)	Arkéa–B&B Hotels Women	
24 November 2024	(France) French Cup #6, Troyes	C2	Amandine Vidon (FRA)	Ardennes Cross Team Gecibat	
14 December 2024	(France) French Cup #7, La Ferté-Bernard	C2	Noémie Garnier (FRA)	Team Guevel Roadborn	
15 December 2024	(France) French Cup #8, La Ferté-Bernard	C2	Noémie Garnier (FRA)	Team Guevel Roadborn	

=== Germany ===
Date	Course	Class	Winner	Team	References
7 September 2024	(Germany) Internationaler GGEW Grand Prix Bensheim – Bundesliga #1, Bensheim	C2	Kiona Crabbé (BEL)	Athletes for Hope	
8 September 2024	(Germany) 4 Bikes Festival – Bundesliga #2, Lützelbach	C2	Cancelled		
21 September 2024	(Germany) International Cyclo-Cross Bad Salzdetfurth #1, Bad Salzdetfurth	C2	Aniek van Alphen (NED)	777	
22 September 2024	(Germany) International Cyclo-Cross Bad Salzdetfurth #2, Bad Salzdetfurth	C2	Aniek van Alphen (NED)	777	
6 October 2024	(Germany) Bundesliga #5, Düsseldorf	C2	Cancelled		
20 October 2024	(Germany) Rund um den Lohner Aussichtsturm – Bundesliga 6, Lohne	NE	Cordula Biermann (GER)		
26–27 October 2024	(Germany) Bundesliga #7, München	C2	Cancelled		
9 November 2024	(Germany) Vaihinger Radcross 2024 – Bundesliga 8, Vaihingen an der Enz	NE	Lisa Heckmann (GER)		
10 November 2024	(Germany) Magstadter Radcross – Bundesliga 9, Magstadt	NE	Jule Märkl (GER)	Canyon–SRAM Generation	
16 November 2024	(Germany) Bundesliga 10, Kleinmachnow	NE	Cordula Biermann (GER)		
17 November 2024	(Germany) Bundesliga 11, Kleinmachnow	NE	Stefanie Paul (GER)	STEVENS Racing Team Frauen	
7–8 December 2024	Bundesliga 12 – Championships off all states of Germany, –, Bad Salzdetfurth, Neubrandenburg	NE	(Baden-Württemberg) Angelina Geschwender (Lower Saxony) Stefanie Paul (Mecklenburg-Vorpommern) – (Rhineland-Palatinate) Janina Morin Bender (Hesse) Lisa Heckmann (Hamburg) Julia-Katharina Pfeil (Bremen (state)) — (Schleswig-Holstein) Cordula Biermann	Radsport-Team Lutz; STEVENS Racing Team	
29 December 2024	(Germany) Bundesliga 13, Vechta	NE	Cordula Biermann (GER)		

=== Great Britain ===
Date	Course	Class	Winner	Team	References
6 October 2024	(United Kingdom) National Trophy Series Round 1, Derby	C2	Alderney Baker (GBR)	Team Empella	
27 October 2024	(United Kingdom) National Trophy Series Round 2, South Shields	C2	Alderney Baker (GBR)	Team Empella	
17 November 2024	(United Kingdom) National Trophy Series Round 3, Paignton	C2	Anna Flynn (GBR)	Team Spectra Cannondale p/b Das	
8 December 2024	(United Kingdom) National Trophy Series Round 4, Clanfield	C2	Cancelled		
5 January 2025	(United Kingdom) National Trophy Series Round 5, Bradford	C2	Cancelled		

=== Hungary ===
Date	Course	Class	Winner	Team	References
12 October 2024	(Hungary) Kermann IT Cyclo-Cross Challenge 1, Etyek	NE	Regina Bruchner (HUN)	GreenZone-ZKSE	
23 October 2024	(Hungary) KunCross - Cyclocross Magyar Kupa 1, Kecskemét	NE	Regina Bruchner (HUN)	GreenZone-ZKSE	
9 November 2024	(Hungary) Velopark Cyclo-Cross - Cyclocross Magyar Kupa 2, Debrecen	C2	Regina Bruchner (HUN)	GreenZone-ZKSE	
10 November 2024	(Hungary) Velopark Cyclo-Cross - Cyclocross Magyar Kupa 3, Debrecen	C2	Regina Bruchner (HUN)	GreenZone-ZKSE	
23 November 2024	(Hungary) Kermann IT Cyclo-Cross Challenge 2, Újbuda	NE	Janka Farkas (HUN)	Team Cookina ASKÖ ARBÖ Graz	
24 November 2024	(Hungary) Velopark Cyclo-Cross - Cyclocross Magyar Kupa 4, Újbuda	NE	Regina Bruchner (HUN)	GreenZone-ZKSE	
8 December 2024	(Hungary) Velopark Cyclo-Cross - Cyclocross Magyar Kupa 5, Siklós	NE	Regina Bruchner (HUN)	GreenZone-ZKSE	
28 December 2024	(Hungary) Kermann IT Cyclo-Cross Challenge 3, Kiskunlacháza	NE	Viktória Szekeres (HUN)	KTM Team Hungary	

=== Ireland ===
Date	Course	Class	Winner	Team	References
6 October 2024	(Republic of Ireland) Cyclo-cross National Series #1, Belfast	NE	Greta Lawless (IRL)	Team WORC	
27 October 2024	(Republic of Ireland) Cyclo-cross National Series #2, Clonbur	NE	Caoimhe May (IRL)	Orwell Wheelers Cycling Club	
24 November 2024	(Republic of Ireland) Cyclo-cross National Series #3, Thurles	NE	Doireann Killeen (IRL)	Kilcullen Cycling Club Murphy Geospacial	
5 January 2025	(Republic of Ireland) Cyclo-cross National Series #4, Jenkinstown	NE	Doireann Killeen (IRL)	Kilcullen Cycling Club Murphy Geospacial	

=== Italy ===
Date	Course	Class	Winner	Team	References
29 September 2024	(Italy) GP Centro Corridomnia – #1 Giro Regioni CX, Corridonia	NE	Carlotta Borello (ITA)	Team Cingolani	
6 October 2024	(Italy) 2° GP Citta' Di Tarvisio – #2 Giro Regioni CX, Tarvisio	C2	Carlotta Borello (ITA)	Team Cingolani	
13 October 2024	(Italy) CX Rivellino – #3 Giro Regioni CX, Osoppo	C2	Carlotta Borello (ITA)	Team Cingolani	
3 November 2024	(Italy) GP Val Fontanabuona – #4 Giro Regioni CX, Genova	NC	Carlotta Borello (ITA)	Team Cingolani	
9 November 2024	(Italy) 3° Gran Premio Città di Cantoira – #5 Giro Regioni CX, Cantoira	NC	Carlotta Borello (ITA)	Team Cingolani	
22 December 2024	(Italy) 3° GP Caroli Hotels – #6 Giro Regioni CX, Gallipoli	NC	Emma Franceschini (ITA)	Jam's Bike Team Buja	

=== Japan ===
Date	Course	Class	Winner	Team	References
6 October 2024	(Japan) Ibaraki Cyclocross Tsuchiura Stage, Tsuchiura	NE	Akari Kobayashi (JPN)	Yowamushi Pedal Cycling Team	
27 October 2024	(Japan) Tohoku Cyclocross Series 2024-2025 Crossing Round, Watari	NE	Akari Kobayashi (JPN)	Yowamushi Pedal Cycling Team	
3 November 2024	(Japan) Gotemba Cyclocross Supported by Shonan CX, Gotemba	NE	Yui Ishida (JPN)	TRKWorks	
10 November 2024	(Japan) Makuhari Cross 24-25, Chiba	NE	Akari Kobayashi (JPN)	Yowamushi Pedal Cycling Team	
17 November 2024	(Japan) Kansai Cyclocross Biwako Grand Prix, Kusatsu	NE/C2	Akari Kobayashi (JPN)	Yowamushi Pedal Cycling Team	
23–24 November 2024	(Japan) Tokai Cyclocross Round 2 Wild Nature Plaza, Inazawa	NE	Akari Kobayashi (JPN)	Yowamushi Pedal Cycling Team	
1 December 2024	(Japan) Matsubushi Cyclocross, Matsubushi	NE	Nanami Ishikawa (JPN)	Champion System Japan TT Wadaya	
19 January 2025	(Japan) Zaousama Cup Tohoku Cyclocross 2025, Miyagi Prefecture	NC	Kasuga Watabe (JPN)	Meiji University	
2 February 2025	(Japan) Yamaguchi Cyclocross, Yamaguchi	NC	Yui Ishida (JPN)	TRKWorks	
8–9 February 2025	(Japan) Yowamushi Pedal x Champion System CYCLOCROSS TOKYO 2025, Tokyo	NC	Kasuga Watabe (JPN)	Meiji University	

=== Lithuania ===
Date	Course	Class	Winner	Team	References
8 September 2024	(Lithuania) Velo CX Phase I, Vilnius	NE	Neimantė Laužikaitė (LTU)	Domino	
21 September 2024	(Lithuania) Velo CX Phase II, Vilnius	NE	Monika Liutinskaitė (LTU)	Viesulo SC	
6 October 2024	(Lithuania) Velo CX Phase III, Vilnius	NE	Gabija Jonaitytė (LTU)	Fortūna DK	
20 October 2024	(Lithuania) Velo CX Phase IV, Utena	NC	Gabija Jonaitytė (LTU)	Fortūna DK	
27 October 2024	(Lithuania) Velo CX Phase V, Vilnius	NC	Monika Liutinskaitė (LTU)	Klaipėda Cycling Team	

=== Luxembourg ===
Date	Course	Class	Winner	Team	References
28 September 2024	(Luxembourg) Urban Night Cross – #1 Skoda Cup CX, Kayl	NE	Inés Marchesan (FRA)	Bikeenergy School	
5 October 2024	(Luxembourg) Cyclo-Cross à Schouweiler, Schouweiler	NE	Gwen Nothum (LUX)	UC Dippach	
13 October 2024	(Luxembourg) Festival du Cyclo-Cross "Memorial Claude Michely" – #2 Skoda Cup CX, Kayl	NE	Gwen Nothum (LUX)	UC Dippach	
20 October 2024	(Luxembourg) Cyclo Cross régional / UC Munnerëfer Velosfrënn – #3 Skoda Cup CX, Mondorf-les-Bains	NE	Gwen Nothum (LUX)	UC Dippach	
27 October 2024	(Luxembourg) Grand Prix de la Commune de Contern – #4 Skoda Cup CX, Contern	C2/NE	Marie Schreiber (LUX)	Team SD Worx–Protime	
3 November 2024	(Luxembourg) Festival Cyclo-Cross Jos Bausch / VF Gusty Bruch, Brouch	NE	Nina Berton (LUX)	Ceratizit–WNT Pro Cycling	
10 November 2024	Team Snoooze Cyclocross, Luxembourg City	NE	Cancelled		
16 November 2024	(Luxembourg) 2eme GP de l'Armée Cyclo-Cross Interrégional / Team Toproad – #5 Skoda Cup CX, Diekirch	NE	Christine Majerus (LUX)	Team SD Worx–Protime	
17 November 2024	(Luxembourg) Cyclo-Cross Régional / LG Belvaux, Belvaux	NE	Nina Berton (LUX)	Ceratizit–WNT Pro Cycling	
24 November 2024	(Luxembourg) Festival du Cyclo-Cross (Manche Skoda Cross Cup) SaF Zeisseng – #6 Skoda Cup CX, Leudelange	NE	Gwen Nothum (LUX)	UC Dippach	
1 December 2024	(Luxembourg) LP 07 Schifflange – #7 Skoda Cup CX, Schifflange	NE	Gwen Nothum (LUX)	UC Dippach	
8 December 2024	(Luxembourg) VV Tooltime – #8 Skoda Cup CX, Préizerdaul	NE	Maïté Barthels (LUX)	CT Atertdaul	
15 December 2024	(Luxembourg) UCN Ettelbruck – #9 Skoda Cup CX, Ettelbruck	NE	Gwen Nothum (LUX)	UC Dippach	
1 January 2025	(Luxembourg) UC Pétange – #10 Skoda Cup CX, Pétange	C2/NE	Xaydée Van Sinaey (BEL)	Crelan - Corendon	
5 January 2025	(Luxembourg) LG Alzingen – #11 Skoda Cup CX, Alzingen	NE	Gwen Nothum (LUX)	UC Dippach	
19 January 2025	(Luxembourg) VC Mamerdall – #12 Skoda Cup CX, Mamer	NE	Cancelled		

=== Netherlands ===
Date	Course	Class	Winner	Team	References
14 September 2024	(Netherlands) Kleeberg Cross Day 1, Mechelen	NE	Roxanne Takken (NED)	WV de Amstel	
15 September 2024	(Netherlands) Kleeberg Cross Day 2, Mechelen	C2	Inge van der Heijden (NED)	Crelan-Corendon	
19 October 2024	(Netherlands) Helmcross, Helmond	NE	Sara Sonnemans (NED)	WV Schijndel	
19 October 2024	(Netherlands) RK veldrijden Zuid combi met Helmcross, Helmond	NE	Sara Sonnemans (NED)	WV Schijndel	
19 October 2024	(Netherlands) RK veldrijden Zuid combi met Helmcross, Juniors, Helmond	NE	Judith Alleleijn (NED)	Zuyd CT	
22 October 2024	(Netherlands) Kiremko Nacht Van Woerden, Woerden	C2	Lucinda Brand (NED)	Baloise–Trek Lions	
The Exact Cross #3
2 November 2024	(Netherlands) 10e Nationale Veldrit van Rhenen, Rhenen	NC	Sara Sonnemans (NED)	WV Schijndel	
9 November 2024	(Netherlands) Internationale Cyclo-Cross Rucphen, Rucphen	C2	Laura Verdonschot (BEL)	De Ceuster-Bouwpunt	
10 November 2024	(Netherlands) VAM-berg Cross Wijster, Wijster	C2	Jamie de Beer (NED)	Heizomat Radteam	
10 November 2024	(Netherlands) VAM-berg Cross Wijster, Juniors, Wijster	C2	Noï Moes (NED)	WV Schijndel	
16–17 November 2024	(Netherlands) Nationale Veldrit Almelo, Almelo	NE	Sera Gademan (NED)	R en TV de Zwaluwen	
23 November 2024	(Netherlands) Janet Memorial Veldrit van Hilversum, Laren	NE	Sera Gademan (NED)	R en TV de Zwaluwen	
1 December 2024	(Netherlands) De Bultcross Leiden tevens Regiokampioenschap West, Leiden	NE	Selena Bas (NED)	DRC de Mol	
1 December 2024	(Netherlands) Regiokampioenschap Veldrijden Regio West, Leiden	NE	Jasmijn Bloemheuvel (NED)	Talent Cycling	
1 December 2024	(Netherlands) Regiokampioenschap Veldrijden Regio West, Juniors, Leiden	NE	Selena Bas (NED)	DRC de Mol	
7 December 2024	(Netherlands) 43e Nationale Veldrit van Amersfoort, Amersfoort	NE	Sera Gademan (NED)	R en TV de Zwaluwen	
7 December 2024	(Netherlands) 43e Nationale Veldrit van Amersfoort, tevens Regiokampioenschap Regio Midden-Oost, Juniors, Amersfoort	NE	Jill Schmitz (NED)	TWC Het Snelle Wiel	
7 December 2024	(Netherlands) Regiokampioenschap Regio Midden-Oost, Amersfoort	NE	Sera Gademan (NED)	R en TV de Zwaluwen	
7 December 2024	(Netherlands) Regiokampioenschap Regio Midden-Oost, Juniors, Amersfoort	NE	Loïs de Jong (NED)	W.V. Eemland	
14 December 2024	(Netherlands) Nationale Cross Gerrit Pluimers sr Enter, Enter	NE	Anniek Mos (NED)	GT Krush Rebellease	
14 December 2024	(Netherlands) REGIO KAMPIOENSCHAPPEN NOORD, Enter	NE	Anniek Mos (NED)	GT Krush Rebellease	
14 December 2024	(Netherlands) REGIO KAMPIOENSCHAPPEN NOORD, Juniors, Enter	NE	Sterre Thijssen (NED)	WSV de Peddelaars	
15 December 2024	(Netherlands) Nationaal veldrit Nijverdal, Nijverdal	NE	Anniek Mos (NED)	GT Krush Rebellease	
22 December 2024	(Netherlands) APW Auto's Veldrit van Reusel, Reusel	NE	Anniek Mos (NED)	GT Krush Rebellease	
26 December 2024	(Netherlands) Kerstcross 2024, Norg	NE	Cancelled		
5 January 2025	(Netherlands) 20e Kasteelcross Vorden, Vorden	NE	Anniek Mos (NED)	GT Krush Rebellease	
19 January 2025	(Netherlands) Nationale Cyclo Cross Huijbergen, Huijbergen	NE	Larissa Hartog (NED)	WV Schijndel	

=== Norway ===
Date	Course	Class	Winner	Team	References
28 September 2024	(Norway) NC Sykkelkross I, Lillehammer	NC	Berit Nordsæter Resell (NOR)	Lillehammer CK	
29 September 2024	(Norway) NC Sykkelkross II, Lillehammer	NC	Berit Nordsæter Resell (NOR)	Lillehammer CK	
12 October 2024	(Norway) NC Sykkelkross III, Asker	NC	Lea Lützen (GER)		
13 October 2024	(Norway) NC Sykkelkross IV, Asker	NC	Lisa Kristine Jorde (NOR)	Tangen Watt og Oksygen Cykleklubb	
19 October 2024	(Norway) NC Sykkelkross V, Oslo	NC	Thea Siggerud (NOR)	Soon CK	
20 October 2024	(Norway) NC Sykkelkross VI, Oslo	NC	Mie Bjørndal Ottestad (NOR)	Uno-X Mobility	
26 October 2024	(Norway) NC Sykkelkross VII, Skien	NC	Karoline Flaterud (NOR)	Asker CK	
27 October 2024	(Norway) NC Sykkelkross VIII, Skien	NC	Åshild Tovsrud (NOR)	Asker CK	
2 November 2024	(Norway) NC Sykkelkross IX, Drammen	NC	Mie Bjørndal Ottestad (NOR)	Uno-X Mobility	
3 November 2024	(Norway) NC Sykkelkross X, Drammen	NC	Åshild Tovsrud (NOR)	Asker CK	

=== Poland ===
Date	Course	Class	Winner	Team	References
19 October 2024	(Poland) Odersky Pohar, Gościęcin	NC	Zofia Bluszcz (POL)	Phoenix Cycling Team	
20 October 2024	(Poland) Puchar Polski, Memoriał Mieczysława Godzwona, Kluczbork	NC	Malwina Mul (POL)	MAT Atom Deweloper Wrocław	
26 October 2024	(Poland) Ogólnopolski Wyścig w Kolarstwie Przełajowym o Puchar Burmistrza Miasta Słubice, Słubice	NC	Rozalia Dutczak (POL)	LKS Trasa Zielona Góra	
27 October 2024	(Poland) Mistrzostwa Polski LZS, Słubice	NC	Rozalia Dutczak (POL)	LKS Trasa Zielona Góra	
9 November 2024	(Poland) Memoriał Mieczysława Brzezińskiego, Zalesie Górne	NC	Zuzanna Krzystała (POL)	Phoenix Cycling Team	
10 November 2024	(Poland) XXVIII Memoriał Trenera Edwarda Pelki Puchar Burmistrza Miasta i Gminy Szczekociny Jacka Lipy, Szczekociny	NC	Zuzanna Krzystała (POL)	Phoenix Cycling Team	
11 November 2024	(Poland) XLVI Międzynarodowy Wyścig w Kolarstwie Przełajowym Pod Patronatem Burmistrza Gminy i Miasta Koziegłowy Jacka Ślęczki w ramach obchodów Święta Niepodległości Polski, Szczekociny	NC	Zuzanna Krzystała (POL)	Phoenix Cycling Team	
16 November 2024	(Poland) Owocowy Przelaj - Laskowice Pomorskie, Laskowice	NC/C2	Zuzanna Krzystała (POL)	Phoenix Cycling Team	
17 November 2024	(Poland) Dalej Na Pólnoc Rowerem Się Nie Da Wladyslawowo-Cetniewo, Władysławowo	NC/C2	Zuzanna Krzystała (POL)	Phoenix Cycling Team	
23 November 2024	(Poland) Ogólnopolski Wyścig w Kolarstwie przełajowym, Koźminek	NC	Zuzanna Krzystała (POL)	Phoenix Cycling Team	
24 November 2024	(Poland) V Ogólnopolski Wyścig w Kolarstwie Przełajowym „Moskava Cyclocross” O Puchar Burmistrza Miasta Środa Wielkopolska, Środa Wielkopolska	NC	Zuzanna Krzystała (POL)	Phoenix Cycling Team	
30 November 2024	(Poland) Ogólnopolski Wyścig w Kolarstwie Przełajowym, Turawa	NC	Gabriela Wojtyła (POL)	Superior Zator	
1 December 2024	(Poland) Bryksy Cross Gościęcin, Gościęcin	NC/C2	Zuzanna Krzystała (POL)	Phoenix Cycling Team	
7 December 2024	(Poland) Puchar Polski ku czci Hetmana Stefana Czarneckiego - wyścig o Puchar Burmistrza Włoszczowy Grzegorza Dziubka, Włoszczowa	NC	Zuzanna Krzystała (POL)	Phoenix Cycling Team	
8 December 2024	(Poland) Ogólnopolski Wyścig w Kolarstwie Przełajowym „Cyclocross Sławno”, Sławno	NC	Zuzanna Krzystała (POL)	Phoenix Cycling Team	
14 December 2024	(Poland) CX Włoszakowice „Cześć i Chwała Zwycięzcom” Dla Uczczenia 106 Rocznicy Powstania Wielkopolskiego, Włoszakowice	NC	Zuzanna Krzystała (POL)	Phoenix Cycling Team	
15 December 2024	(Poland) Lubuskie Warte Zachodu - Zielona Góra, Zielona Góra	NC/C2	Zuzanna Krzystała (POL)	Phoenix Cycling Team	
21 December 2024	(Poland) Ogólnopolski Wyścig w Kolarstwie Przełajowym o Puchar Marszałka woj. mazowieckiego, Warsaw	NC			
22 December 2024	(Poland) Międzynarodowy Wyścig w Kolarstwie Przełajowym o Puchar Marszalka woj. mazowieckiego, Warsaw	NC			
28 December 2024	(Poland) Ogólnopolski Wyścig w Kolarstwie Przełajowym o Puchar Prezydenta Ełku, Ełk	NC	Zuzanna Krzystała (POL)	Phoenix Cycling Team	
29 December 2024	(Poland) Puchar Polski w Kolarstwie Przełajowym Ełk 2024, Ełk	NC	Zuzanna Krzystała (POL)	Phoenix Cycling Team	

=== Portugal ===
Date	Course	Class	Winner	Team	References
20 October 2024	1ª Taça de Portugal de Ciclocrosse, Vouzela	C2/NC	Sara Cueto Vega (ESP)	Unicaja Banco - Gijón	
27 October 2024	2ª Taça de Portugal de Ciclocrosse, Melgaço	C1/NC	Lucía González (ESP)	Nesta - MMR CX Team	
23 November 2024	3ª Taça de Portugal de Ciclocrosse, Ansião	NC	Tânia Lima (POR)	SAERTEX Portugal / Edaetech	
24 November 2024	4ª Taça de Portugal de Ciclocrosse, Ílhavo	NC	Tânia Lima (POR)	SAERTEX Portugal / Edaetech	
8 December 2024	5ª Taça de Portugal de Ciclocrosse, Vila Real	NC	Joana Monteiro (POR)	AXPO / FirstBike Team / Vila do Conde	

=== Romania ===
Date	Course	Class	Winner	Team	References
19 October 2024	(Romania) Velocrosul Castanilor / CR CX #1, Florești	NC	Miruna Măda (ROU)	CSM Mediaș	
26 October 2024	(Romania) Romanian CX Cup #2, Vatra Dornei	NC	Salome Stan (ROU)	ACS Living Bike	
2 November 2024	(Romania) Arad CXCup / CR CX #3, Arad	NC	Miruna Măda (ROU)	CSM Mediaș	
9 November 2024	(Romania) Lunca Timișului Continental Anvelope CX / CR CX #4, Timișoara	C1	Loes Sels (BEL)	Proximus - Cyclis - AlphaMotorhomes CT	
1 December 2024	(Romania) Porumbacu CX Race / CR CX #5, Porumbacu de Sus	NC	Miruna Măda (ROU)	CSM Mediaș	
7 December 2024	(Romania) Cluj Winter Race / CR CX #6, Cluj Napoca	NC	Miruna Măda (ROU)	CSM Mediaș	

=== Russia ===
Date	Course	Class	Winner	Team	References
23–24 November 2024	(Russia) FVSR International cyclo-cross series #1, Arkhipo-Osipovka	NC	(Russia) Alina Karlova		
30 November – 1 December 2024	(Russia) FVSR International cyclo-cross series #2, Arkhipo-Osipovka	NC	(Russia) Alina Karlova		
14–15 December 2024	(Russia) FVSR International cyclo-cross series #3, Maykop	NC	(Russia) Anna Mirolyubova		
21–22 December 2024	(Russia) FVSR International cyclo-cross series #4, Maykop	NC	(Russia) Alina Karlova		
18–19 January 2025	(Russia) FVSR International cyclo-cross series #5, Arkhipo-Osipovka	NC	(Russia) Anna Mirolyubova		
1–2 March 2025	(Russia) FVSR International cyclo-cross series #6, Psebay	NC			

=== Slovakia ===
Date	Course	Class	Winner	Team	References
13 October 2024	(Slovakia) Grand Prix Levoča – Slovak Cup #1, Levoča	C2	Malwina Mul (POL)	MAT Atom Deweloper Wrocław	
20 October 2024	(Slovakia) Grand Prix Trnava – Slovak Cup #2, Trnava	C2	Viktória Chladoňová (SVK)	Climberg Sport Team	
9 November 2024	(Slovakia) Grand Prix Topoľčianky – Slovak Cup #3, Topoľčianky	C2	Viktória Chladoňová (SVK)	Climberg Sport Team	
10 November 2024	(Slovakia) Grand Prix Topoľčianky – Slovak Cup #4, Topoľčianky	C2	Viktória Chladoňová (SVK)	Climberg Sport Team	
17 November 2024	(Slovakia) Slovak Cup #5 (part of European Cup), Šamorín	NC	Viktória Chladoňová (SVK)	Climberg Sport Team	
24 November 2024	(Slovakia) Grand Prix Podbrezová – Slovak Cup #7, Podbrezová	NC	Viktória Chladoňová (SVK)	Climberg Sport Team	

=== Slovenia (Winter League) ===
Date	Course	Class	Winner	Team	References
17 November 2024	(Slovenia) 1. Ciklokros Polzela – Winter League #1, Polzela	NE	Kristina Koter (SVN)		
1 December 2024	(Slovenia) Ciklokros Straža – Winter League #2, Straža	NE	Kristina Koter (SVN)		
8 December 2024	(Slovenia) Ciklokros za Pokal občine Tišina – Winter League #3, Tišina	NE	Kristina Koter (SVN)		
26 December 2024	(Slovenia) Ciklokros Ljubljana – Winter League #4, Ljubljana	NE	—N/a	—N/a	

=== Spain ===
Date	Course	Class	Winner	Team	References
6 October 2024	(Spain) Trofeo Villa de Gijón – Spanish Cup #1, Gijón	C2	Laura Verdonschot (BEL)	De Ceuster Bouwpunt	
12 October 2024	(Spain) Ciclocross Internacional Xaxancx – Spanish Cup #2, Pontevedra	C2	Laura Verdonschot (BEL)	De Ceuster Bouwpunt	
26 October 2024	(Spain) G.P KH7 - Dark Cross Les Franqueses – Spanish Cup #3, Les Franqueses del Vallès	C2	Alexandra Valade (FRA)	UVCA Troyes	
10 November 2024	(Spain) Ciclocross Internacional de Karrantza – Spanish Cup #4, Karrantza	C2	Lucía González (ESP)	Nesta - MMR CX Team	
16 November 2024	(Spain) Ciclocros Internacional Ciudad de Tarancón – Spanish Cup #5, Tarancón	C2	Lucía González (ESP)	Nesta - MMR CX Team	
17 November 2024	(Spain) Ciclocross Ciudad de Alcobendas - Enbici – Spanish Cup #6, Alcobendas	C2	Lucía González (ESP)	Nesta - MMR CX Team	
14 December 2024	(Spain) Ciclocross Internacional Ciutat de Xàtiva – Spanish Cup #7, Xàtiva	C2	Sofia Rodríguez (ESP)	Nesta - MMR CX Team	
15 December 2024	(Spain) Cyclocross Internacional Ciudad de Valencia – Spanish Cup #8, Valencia	C2	cancelled		

=== Sweden ===
Date	Course	Class	Winner	Team	References
5 October 2024	(Sweden) Hagströmska CX SWE-CUP #1 2024, Falun	NC	Anna Eriksmo (SWE)	Beijer Coaching CK	
6 October 2024	(Sweden) Hagströmska CX SWE-CUP #2 2024, Falun	NC	Anna Eriksmo (SWE)	Beijer Coaching CK	
12 October 2024	(Sweden) Fristads Cyclocross Weekend Day 1 – SWE Cup #3, Täby	C2/NC	Jinse Peeters (BEL)	De Ceuster Bouwpunt	
13 October 2024	(Sweden) Fristads Cyclocross Weekend Day 2 – SWE Cup #4, Täby	C2/NC	Xan Crees (GBR)	Team Spectra p/b Das	
16 October 2024	(Sweden) Hagströmska CX, Falun	C2/NC	Jinse Peeters (BEL)	De Ceuster Bouwpunt	
19 October 2024	(Sweden) Varberg Cyclocross Day 1 – SWE Cup #5, Varberg	C2/NC	Oda Laforce (NOR)	IF Frøy	
20 October 2024	(Sweden) Varberg Cyclocross Day 2 – SWE Cup #6, Varberg	C2/NC	Jinse Peeters (BEL)	De Ceuster Bouwpunt	
9 November 2024	(Sweden) Malmö CX SWE-CUP #7, Malmö	NC	Åsa Maria Erlandsson (SWE)	Varbergs MTB	
10 November 2024	(Sweden) Malmö CX SWE-CUP #8, Malmö	NC	Åsa Maria Erlandsson (SWE)	Varbergs MTB	

==== Switzerland ====
Date	Course	Class	Winner	Team	References
13 October 2024	(Switzerland) 63. Internationales Radquer Steinmaur / Swiss Cyclocross Cup #1, Steinmaur	C2	Elisabeth Brandau (GER)	EBE–Racing Team	
20 October 2024	(Switzerland) AlperoseQuer Schneisingen / Swiss Cyclocross Cup #2, Schneisingen	C2	Elisabeth Brandau (GER)	EBE–Racing Team	
27 October 2024	(Switzerland) 9. Radquer Mettmenstetten / Swiss Cyclocross Cup #3, Mettmenstetten	C2	Célia Gery (FRA)	AS Bike Racing	
10 November 2024	(Switzerland) Radquer Hittnau / Swiss Cyclocross Cup #4, Hittnau	C2	Elisabeth Brandau (GER)	EBE–Racing Team	
17–18 November 2024	(Switzerland) Crossquer Dielsdorf / Swiss Cyclocross Cup #5, Dielsdorf	C2	Perrine Clauzel (FRA)	Sebmotobikes CX Team	

=== United States ===
Date	Course	Class	Winner	Team	References
14 September 2024	(United States) Trek USCX #1 - Virginia's Blue Ridge Go Cross, Roanoke	C1	Hélène Clauzel (FRA)	Van Rysel Cross Team	
15 September 2024	(United States) Trek USCX #2 - Virginia's Blue Ridge Go Cross, Roanoke	C2	Hélène Clauzel (FRA)	Van Rysel Cross Team	
21 September 2024	(United States) Trek USCX #3 - Rochester Cyclocross, Rochester	C1	Hélène Clauzel (FRA)	Van Rysel Cross Team	
22 September 2024	(United States) Trek USCX #4 - Rochester Cyclocross, Rochester	C2	Hélène Clauzel (FRA)	Van Rysel Cross Team	
28 September 2024	(United States) Trek USCX #5 - Charm City Cross, Baltimore	C1	Hélène Clauzel (FRA)	Van Rysel Cross Team	
29 September 2024	(United States) Trek USCX #6 - Charm City Cross, Baltimore	C2	Hélène Clauzel (FRA)	Van Rysel Cross Team	
5 October 2024	(United States) Trek USCX #7 - Trek CX Cup, Waterloo	C1	Hélène Clauzel (FRA)	Van Rysel Cross Team	
6 October 2024	(United States) Trek USCX #8 - Trek CX Cup, Waterloo	C2	Hélène Clauzel (FRA)	Van Rysel Cross Team	

== Continental Championships (CC) ==
Country	Date	Elite	U23	Juniors
UEC European Cyclo-cross Championships	1–3 November 2024	Men's: (gold) : (Belgium) Thibau Nys; (silver) : (Spain) Felipe Orts; (bronze) : (Belgium) Eli Iserbyt; Women's: (gold) : (Netherlands) Fem van Empel; (silver) : (Netherlands) Ceylin del Carmen Alvarado; (bronze) : (Netherlands) Lucinda Brand	Men's: (gold) : (Belgium) Jente Michels; (silver) : (Italy) Filippo Agostinacchio; (bronze) : (France) Aubin Sparfel; Women's: (gold) : (France) Célia Gery; (silver) : (Luxembourg) Marie Schreiber; (bronze) : (Netherlands) Leonie Bentveld	Men's: (gold) : (Italy) Mattia Agostinacchio; (silver) : (Austria) Valentin Hofer; (bronze) : (Belgium) Mats Vanden Eynde; Women's: (gold) : (Switzerland) Anja Grossman; (silver) : (Czech Republic) Barbora Bukovská; (bronze) : (Italy) Giorgia Pellizotti
Pan American Cyclo-cross Championships	1–3 November 2024	Men's: (gold) : (United States) Eric Brunner; (silver) : (United States) Curtis White; (bronze) : (United States) Andrew Strohmeyer; Women's: (gold) : (Canada) Sidney McGill; (silver) : (Canada) Isabella Holmgren; (bronze) : (United States) Katie Clouse	Men's: (gold) : (Canada) Ian Ackert; (silver) : (United States) Jack Spranger; (bronze) : (United States) Henry Coote; Women's: (gold) : (United States) Lauren Zoerner; (silver) : (Canada) Jenaya Francis; (bronze) : (United States) Kaya Musgrave	Men's: (gold) : (United States) Garrett Beshore; (silver) : (United States) Benjamin Bravman; (bronze) : (Canada) Émilien Belzile; Women's: (gold) : (United States) Alyssa Sarkisov; (silver) : (Canada) Rafaelle Carrier; (bronze) : (Canada) Aislin Hallahan

== World Championships (WC) ==
Country	Date	Elite	U23	Juniors	Mixed Team Relay
UCI Cyclo-cross World Championships	31 January – 2 February 2025	Elite: (Netherlands) Mathieu van der Poel (Belgium) Wout van Aert (Belgium) Thibau Nys (Netherlands) Fem van Empel (Netherlands) Lucinda Brand (Netherlands) Puck Pieterse	U23: (Netherlands) Tibor Del Grosso (Belgium) Kay De Bruyckere (Belgium) Jente Michels (United Kingdom) Zoe Bäckstedt (Luxembourg) Marie Schreiber (Netherlands) Leonie Bentveld	Juniors: (Italy) Mattia Agostinacchio (France) Soren Bruyère Joumard (Italy) Filippo Grigolini (France) Lise Revol (Czech Republic) Barbora Bukovská (Canada) Rafaelle Carrier	Mixed Team Relay: United Kingdom; Zoe Bäckstedt; Milo Wills; Zoe Roche; Oscar Amey; Cat Ferguson; Thomas Mein; Italy; Mattia Agostinacchio; Gioele Bertolini; Giorgia Pellizotti; Lucia Bramati; Sara Casasola; Stefano Viezzi; France; Jules Simon; Florian Fery; Célia Gery; Zélie Lambert; Hélène Clauzel; Joshua Dubau

== National Championships (NC) ==
Country	Date	Elite	U23	Juniors
Albania	11 January 2025	Olsian Velia; Nelia Kabetaj	—N/a	Habib Llana
Austria	12 January 2025	Lukas Hatz; Nadja Heigl	—N/a	Valentin Hofer
Australia	17 August 2024	Max Hobson; Isabella Flint	Jacob Turner; Zoe Davison	Campbell McConnell; Madeleine Wasserbaech
Belarus	10 November 2024	Dainis Bricis; Anastasia Kuznetsova	—N/a	—N/a
Belgium	11–12 January 2025	Thibau Nys; Marion Norbert-Riberolle	Aaron Dockx	Arthur van den Boer; Sanne Laurijssen
Bulgaria	23 February 2025	Borislav Hadzhistoyanov; Ivana Tonkova	—N/a	Danail Ivanov; Ioana Volkanova
Canada	16 November 2024	Ian Ackert; Isabella Holmgren	Mika Comaniuk; Marin Lowe	Emilien Belzile; Rafaelle Carrier
Chile	7 September 2024	Patricio Farías Díaz; Fernanda Castro	Benjamín Cornejo Reyes; Ivonne Risco Narváez	Luciano Quiñones Gatta; Florencia Monsálvez
Czech Republic	11 January 2025	Michael Boroš; Kristýna Zemanová	—N/a	Kryštof Bažant; Lucie Grohová
Denmark	12 January 2025	Daniel Weis Nielsen; Caroline Bohé	—N/a	Oskar Koudal; Mille Foldager Nielsen
Estonia	26 October 2024	Madis Mihkels; Mari-Liis Mõttus	—N/a	Sebastian Suppi; Maria Jürisaar
Finland	26 October 2024	Antti-Jussi Juntunen; Noora Kanerva	—N/a	Niko Terho; Lotte Borremans
France	11–12 January 2025	Clément Venturini; Amandine Fouquenet	Léo Bisiaux	Florian Fery; Lise Revol
Germany	11–12 January 2025	Marcel Meisen; Elisabeth Brandau	Fabian Eder; Sina Van Thiel	Benedikt Benz; Klara Dworatzek
Greece	26 January 2025	Alexandros Athanasiadis; Eleftheria Giachou	—N/a	Andreas Stamatopoulos; Eleni Kaskani
Hungary	12 January 2025	Barnabás Vas; Regina Bruchner	—N/a	Benedek Berencsi; Málna Mudra
Ireland	12 January 2025	Dean Harvey; Esther Wong	—N/a	Conor Murphy
Italy	12 January 2025	Gioele Bertolini; Carlotta Borello	Stefano Viezzi; Valentina Corvi	Patrik Pezzo Rosola; Elisa Ferri
Japan	15 December 2024	Hijiri Oda; Akari Kobayashi	Shingen Yunoki	Koshi Narita; Nanami Ishikawa
Latvia	13 October 2024	Matīss Kaļveršs; Katrina Jaunslaviete	Kristaps Kipurs	Georgs Tjumins; Amanda Reilija Zariņa
Lithuania	10 November 2024	Venantas Lašinis; Gabija Jonaitytė	—N/a	Martynas Medelinskas; Goda Kučejevaitė
Luxembourg	12 January 2025	Loïc Bettendorff; Marie Schreiber	Mathieu Kockelmann; Liv Wenzel	Jonah Flammang-Lies; Kylie Bintz
Netherlands	12 January 2025	Tibor Del Grosso; Puck Pieterse	—N/a	Michiel Mouris; Noï Moes
New Zealand	10 August 2024	Craig Oliver; Josie Wilcox	—N/a	Fletcher Adams; Millie Junge
Norway	10 November 2024	Mats Tubaas Glende; Oda Laforce	—N/a	Sindre Orholm-Lønseth; Ida Østbye Støvern
Poland	12 January 2025	Marek Konwa; Antonina Białek	—N/a	Kacper Mizuro; Marysia Ambrożkiewicz
Portugal	12 January 2025	Rafael Sousa; Beatriz Guerra	João Fonseca	Gonçalo Costa
Romania	12 January 2025	Jozsef-Attila Malnasi; Wendy Bunea	Dragoș Stavăr	Mihai Brînză; Flavia Bunea
Slovakia	23 November 2024	Matej Ulík; Viktória Chladoňová	—N/a	Michal Sichta
Slovenia	26 December 2024	Mihael Štajnar	—N/a	Luka Maksimović; Eva Terpin
Spain	11–12 January 2025	Felipe Orts; Sofia Rodríguez	Miguel Rodríguez Novoa	Benjamin Noval Suárez; Lorena Patiño Villanueva
Sweden	24 November 2024	Filip Mård; Caroline Andersson	—N/a	Vilmer Ekman; Elinore Nilsson
Switzerland	12 January 2025	Kevin Kuhn; Rebekka Estermann	Finn Treudler; Jana Glaus	Lewin Iten; Anja Grossmann
United Kingdom	12 January 2025	Cameron Mason; Xan Crees	—N/a	Oscar Amey; Zoe Roche
United States	14 December 2024	Andrew Strohmeyer; Vida Lopez De San Roman	Henry Coote; Katherine Sarkisov	Garrett Beshore; Lidia Cusack
