= Åsa Maria Erlandsson =

Swedish cyclist

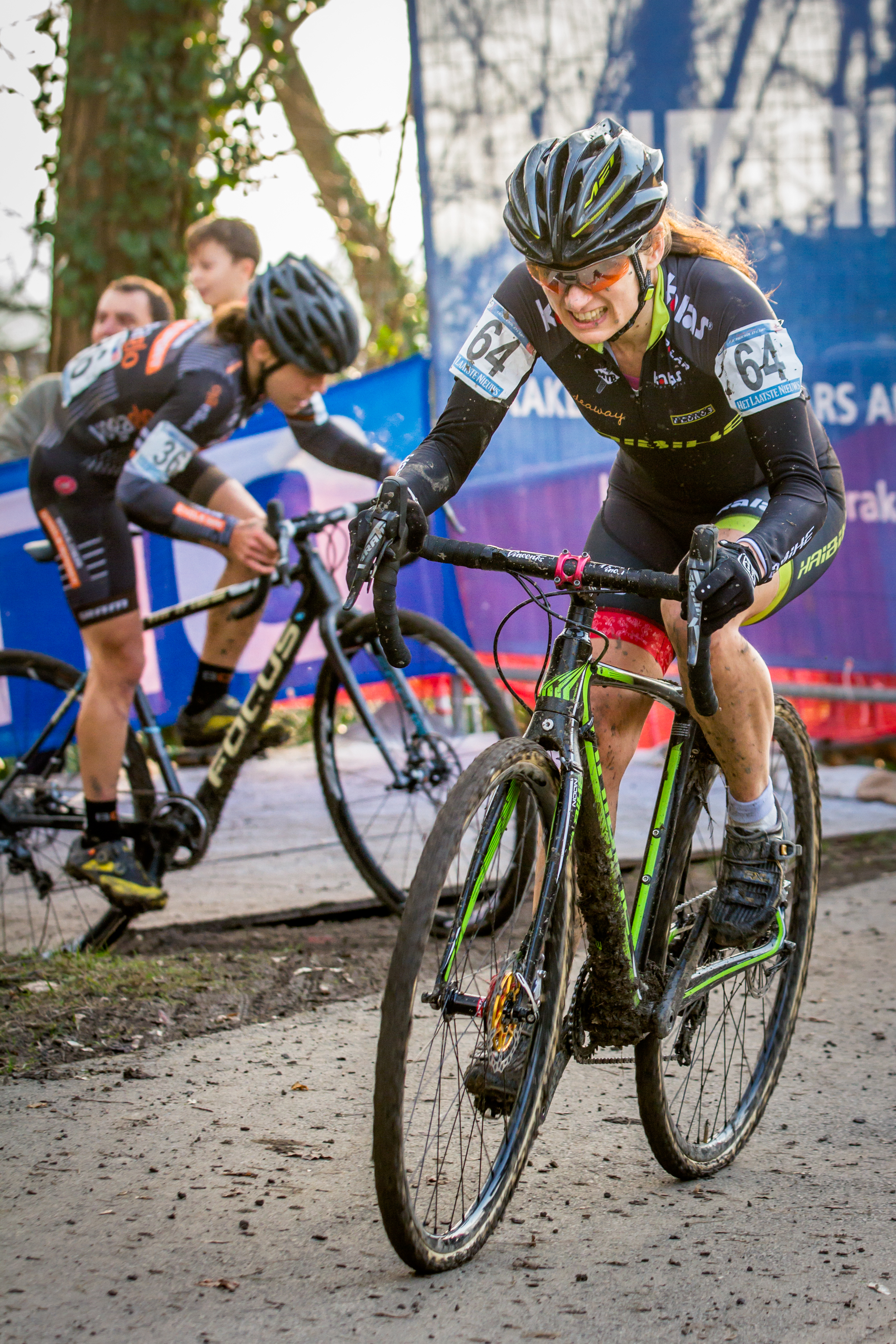

Personal information
- Born: 30 January 1974 (age 52)

Cycling career
- Sport: Cycling
- Discipline: Cyclo-cross
- Role: Rider

Åsa Maria Erlandsson (born 30 January 1974) is a Swedish female cyclo-cross cyclist. She represented her nation in the women's elite event at the 2016 UCI Cyclo-cross World Championships in Heusden-Zolder.
