= Eversel =

- Village
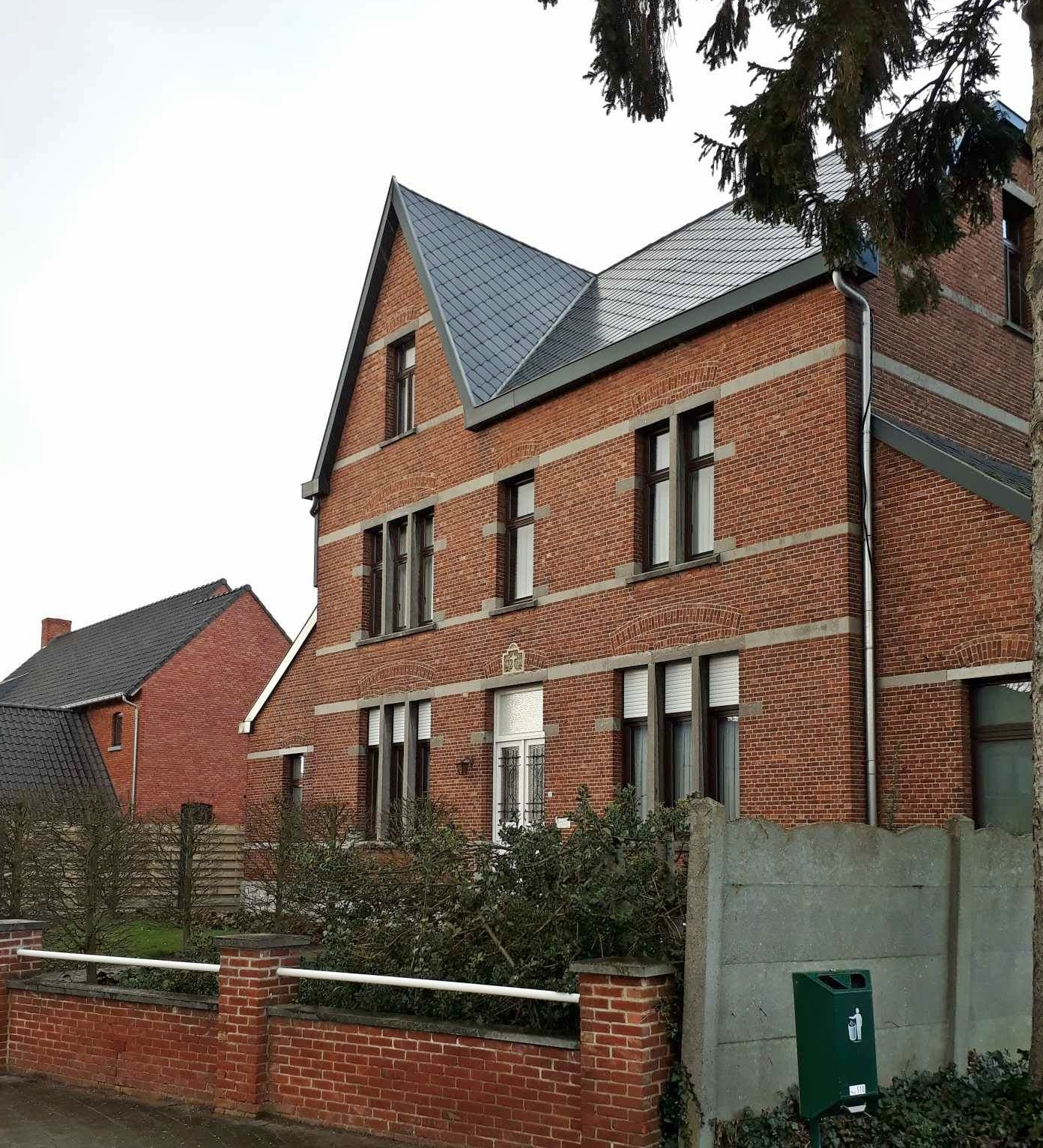

- Location in Belgium
- Coordinates: 51°01′30″N 5°14′17″E
- Country: Belgium
- Community: Flemish Community
- Province: Limburg
- Municipality: Heusden-Zolder

Area
  - Total: 5.49 km^{2} (2.12 sq mi)

Population (2021)
  - Total: 2,643
  - Density: 481/km^{2} (1,250/sq mi)
- Time zone: CET

Eversel is a village in Heusden that is part of the municipality of Heusden-Zolder, Belgium. It is located in the northwestern corner of the municipality.

Eversel is also a Roman Catholic parish established in 1839. The local Roman Catholic church is dedicated to Saint James the Greater (Sint-Jacobus de Meerdere) and was inaugurated on 5 September 1849. The nearby parish house is named Sint-Baaf after Saint Bavo.

Historically Eversel is a part of Houweiken that was part of the fiefdom of Vogelzang. Although a part of Heusden, the dialect of Eversel tends to be closer to that of Beringen. It is a part of the Western Limburgish dialects, although linguists are not clear if the dialects in this region and especially the ones around Beringen are rather Brabantian than Limburgish.
