= ENVE Composites =

Bicycle parts company

ENVE Composites is a cycling parts company based in Ogden, Utah, making high-end carbon wheels and other bike parts. It was founded in 2005 as Edge Composites, renaming to ENVE Composites in 2010.

== Background ==
ENVE moved into their 80,000 square feet (7,400 m^{2}) Ogden Utah building in 2016.

Amer Sports, the parent of Mavic and Suunto, purchased the company in 2016 for $50 million. Amer was purchased by Chinese conglomerate Anta Sports in 2019, who then spun out Amer Sports in an underwhelming IPO in 2024.

Amer Sports sold ENVE to PV3 Investments LLC in a deal that closed in 2025.
