= Hever, Belgium =

Coordinates: 51°00′N 4°33′E

Hever is a village in the province of Flemish Brabant in Flanders, Belgium. It was a separate municipality until 1977 and is now a part of Boortmeerbeek.
