= Alzingen =

Coordinates: 49°34′N 6°10′E

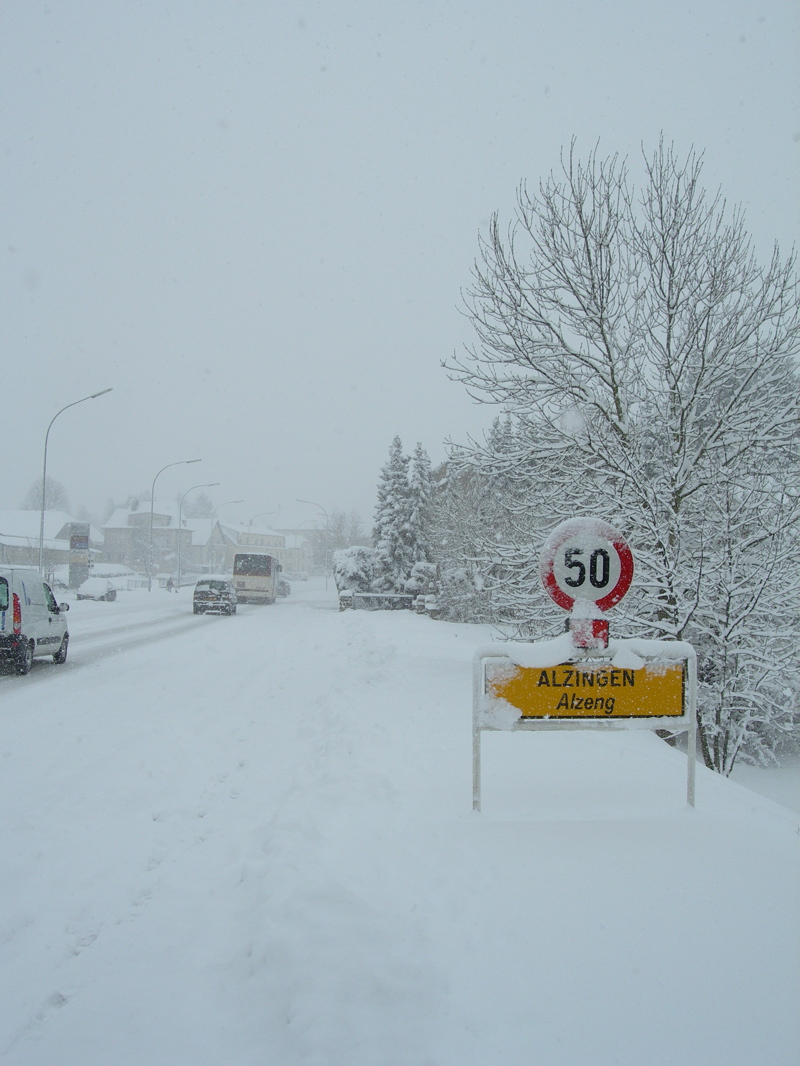
Route de Thionville, Alzingen

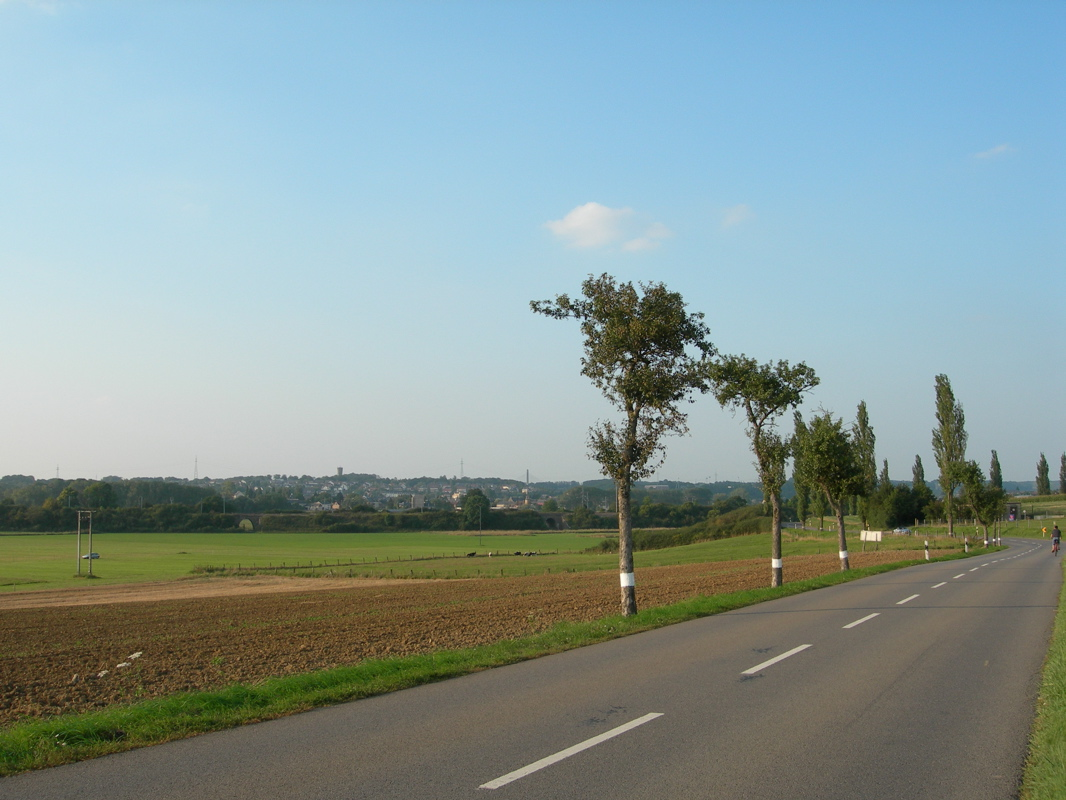
Route de Roeser, Alzingen

Alzingen (German pronunciation: [ˈaltsɪŋən]; Luxembourgish: Alzeng) is a town in the commune of Hesperange, in southern Luxembourg. As of September 2026, the town has a population of 3,192.

The town's main throughfare is the Route de Thionville, which runs from Thionville, France, to Luxembourg City.
