= Psebay =

Psebay Псебай
- Urban-type settlement
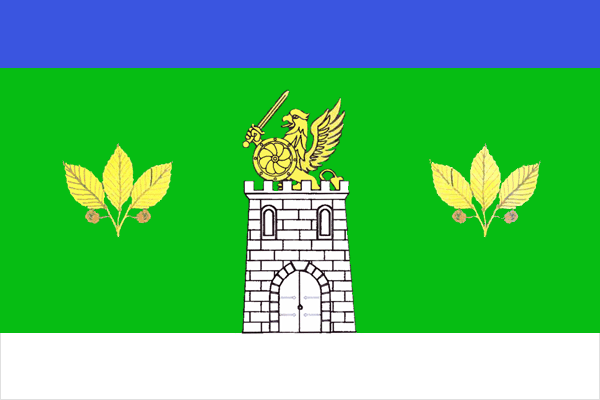
- Flag
- Interactive map of Psebay
- Location of Psebay Psebay (Krasnodar Krai)
- Coordinates: 44.1088°N 40.7914°E
- Country: Russia
- Federal subject: Krasnodar Krai
- Administrative district: Mostovsky District
- Founded: 1862
- Elevation: 640 m (2,100 ft)

Population (2010 Census)
  - Total: 10,839
  - Estimate (2023): 10,473 (−3.4%)
- Time zone: UTC+3 (MSK)
- Postal code: 352585
- OKTMO ID: 03633156051

Psebay (Russian: Псеба́й) is an urban locality (an urban-type settlement) in Mostovsky District of Krasnodar Krai, Russia. Population: 10,404 (2020), 10,839 (2010 census); 11,031 (2002 census); 11,207 (1989 Soviet census).
