= Pierric =

- Commune
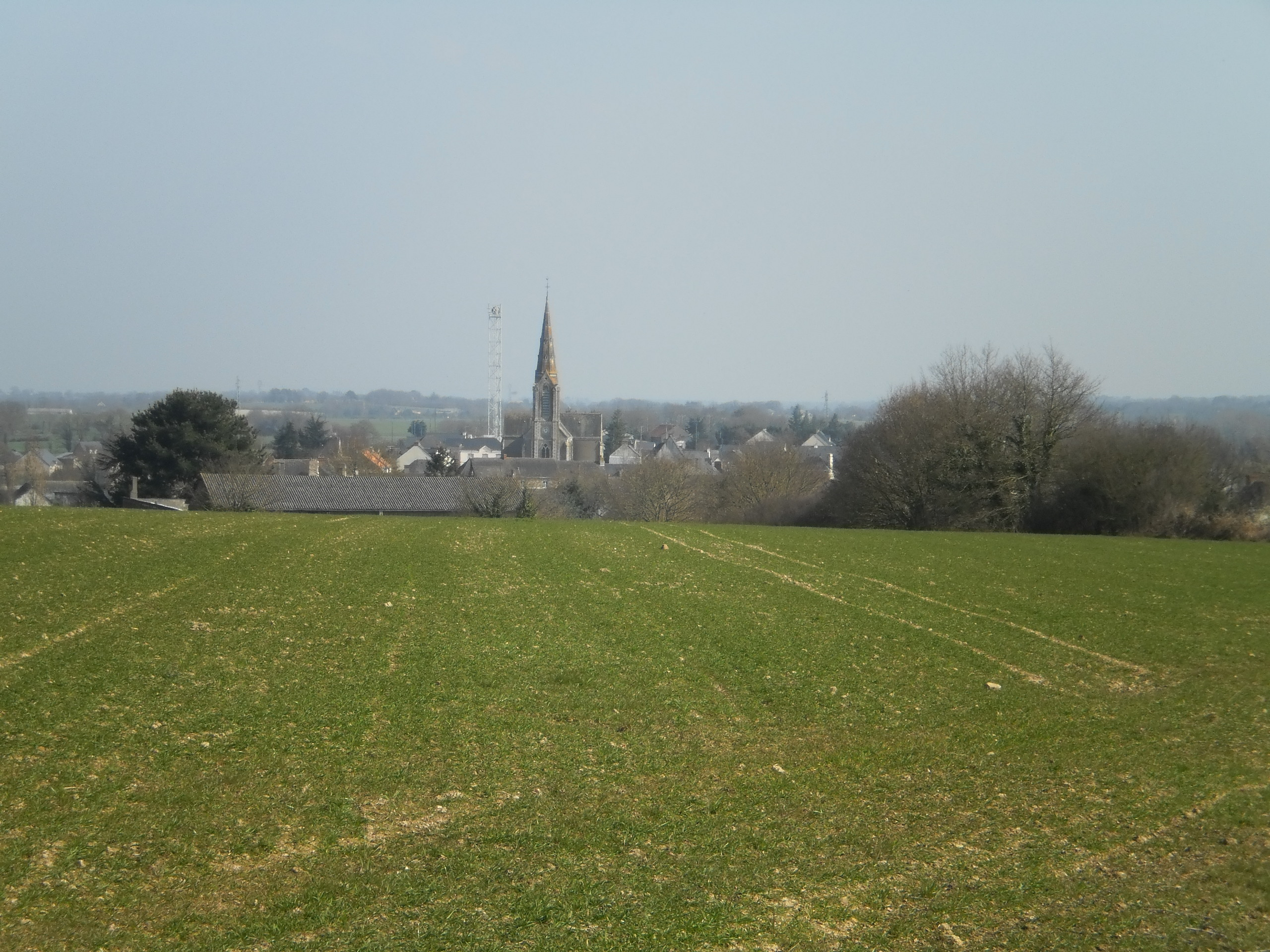
- Location of Pierric
- Location within France Location within Pays de la Loire
- Coordinates: 47°41′14″N 1°44′07″W
- Country: France
- Region: Pays de la Loire
- Department: Loire-Atlantique
- Arrondissement: Châteaubriant-Ancenis
- Canton: Guémené-Penfao
- Intercommunality: Redon Agglomération

Government
  - Mayor (2020–2026): Florent Coutant
- Area^{1}: 27.3 km^{2} (10.5 sq mi)
- Highest elevation: 78 m (256 ft)
- Lowest elevation: 2 m (6.6 ft)
- Population (2023): 1,010
  - Density: 37.0/km^{2} (95.8/sq mi)
- Time zone: UTC+01:00 (CET)
  - Summer (DST): UTC+02:00 (CEST)
- INSEE/Postal code: 44123 /44290
- ^{1} French Land Register data, which excludes lakes, ponds, glaciers > 1 km^{2} (0.386 sq mi or 247 acres) and river estuaries.

Pierric (French pronunciation: [pjɛʁik]; Breton: Pierig) is a commune in the Loire-Atlantique department in western France.

== Geography ==
The river Chère forms all of the commune's northern border, then flows into the Vilaine.

== Population ==
Historical population
Year	Pop.	±% p.a.
1968	896	—
1975	791	−1.76%
1982	816	+0.45%
1990	781	−0.55%
1999	783	+0.03%
2007	879	+1.46%
2012	980	+2.20%
2017	976	−0.08%
2023	1,010	+0.57%
Source: INSEE

== See also ==
- Communes of the Loire-Atlantique department
