= Pottendorf =

- Municipality
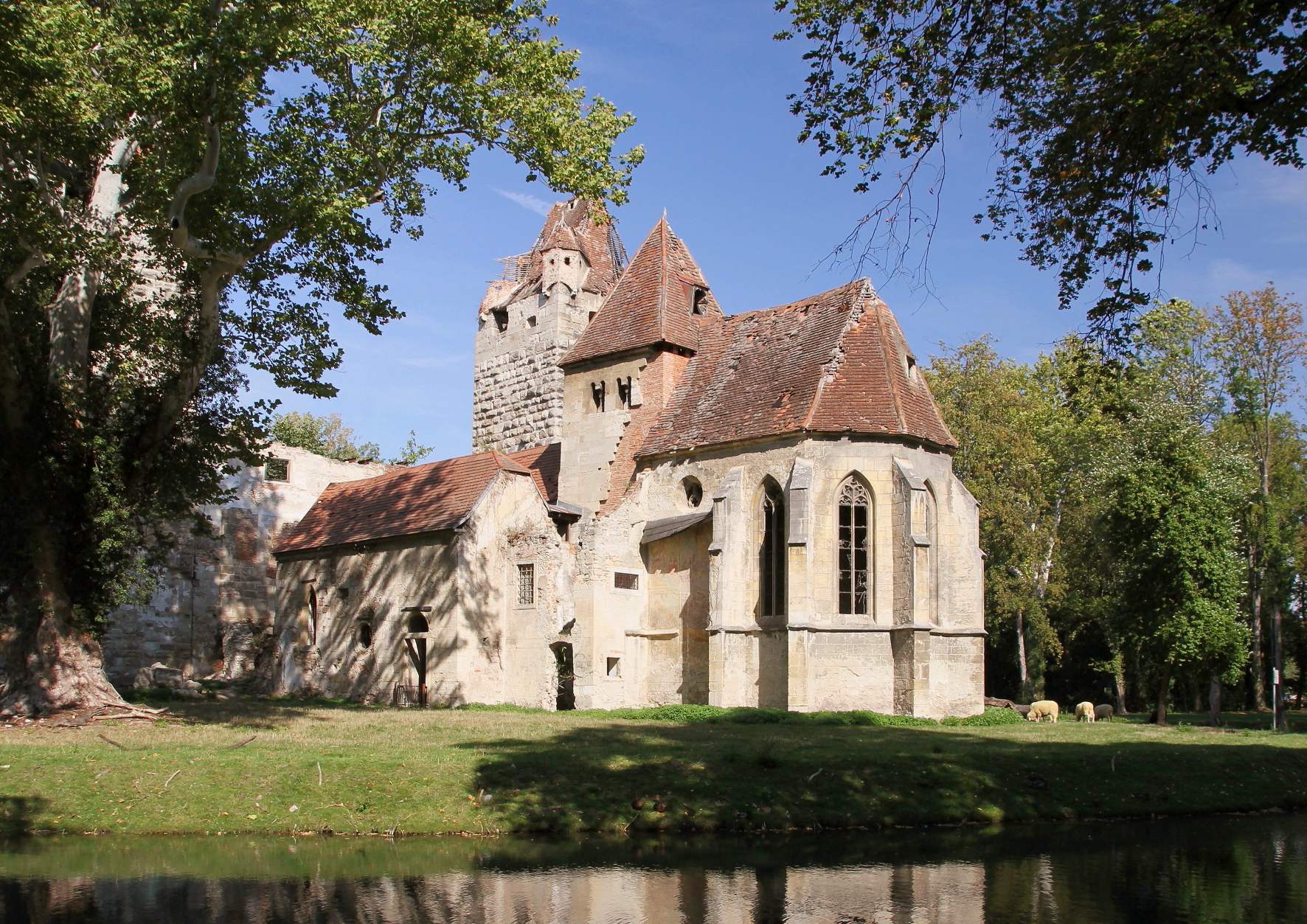
- Pottendorf Castle

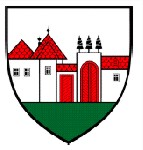
- Coat of arms

- Location within Austria
- Coordinates: 47°54′N 16°23′E
- Country: Austria
- State: Lower Austria
- District: Baden

Government
  - Mayor: Thomas Sabbata-Valteiner (SPÖ)

Area
  - Total: 39.84 km^{2} (15.38 sq mi)
- Elevation: 218 m (715 ft)

Population (2018-01-01)
  - Total: 7,049
  - Density: 176.9/km^{2} (458.3/sq mi)
- Time zone: UTC+1 (CET)
  - Summer (DST): UTC+2 (CEST)
- Postal code: 2486
- Area code: 02623
- Website: www.pottendorf.gv.at

Pottendorf is a town in the district of Baden in Lower Austria in Austria.

== Population ==
Historical population
| Year | Pop. | ±% |
|---|---|---|
| 1971 | 5,127 | — |
| 1981 | 5,328 | +3.9% |
| 1991 | 5,482 | +2.9% |
| 2001 | 5,930 | +8.2% |
| 2011 | 6,354 | +7.2% |
