= Mieczysław Witold Gutkowski =

Polish lawyer and economist

Mieczysław Witold Gutkowski (July 9, 1893, in Szumlin – September 17, 1943, in Wilno) was a Polish lawyer, an economist who specialized in public finance, and one of the first scholars of economic analysis of law in Poland. He was a professor at the Stefan Batory University in Wilno. He was murdered by German SS units and Lithuanian collaborators in the Ponary massacre.

== Education ==
He acquired his secondary education in Warsaw and finished his law studied in Saint Petersburg. He remained in Saint Petersburg as an assistant in the Department Finance. During this time he wrote several research papers concerning the public finances of Congress Poland. In 1917, after Poland regained its independence, he was a member of the Liquidation Committee of Congress Poland.

== Government work ==
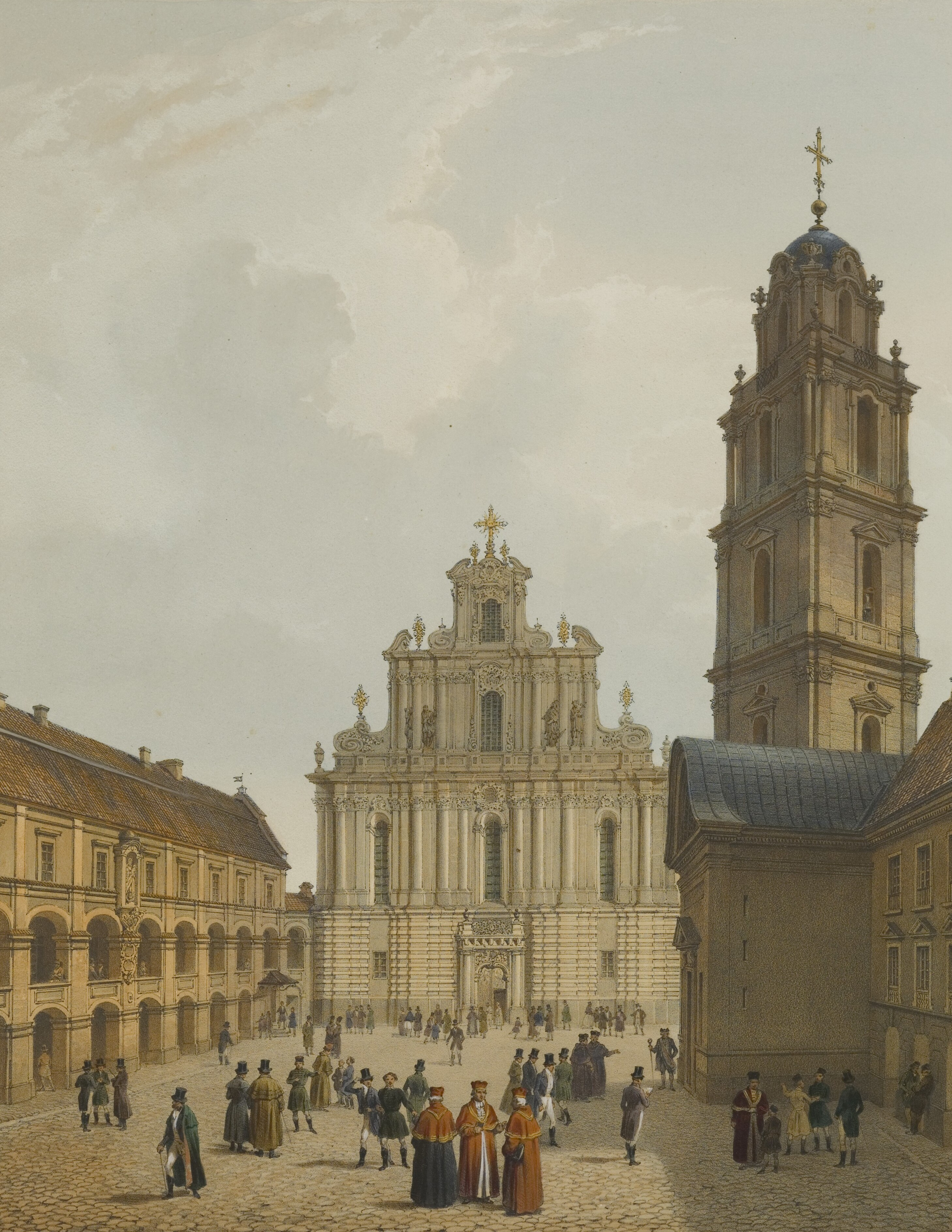
Stefan Batory University in Wilno where Gutkowski was on the faculty

In interwar Poland he worked for the Treasury Department where he studied general questions of economic policy, treasury law and macroeconomics. During this time he was one of the few scholars engaged in the study of public finance. In 1927 he published an influential work "Zarys prawodawstwa z dziedziny skarbowości i gospodarki państwowej" (A sketch of economic and national treasury laws). In 1924 he joined the faculty at the Stefan Batory University in Wilno. Between 1931 and 1939 he was the editor and publisher of an academic journal "Prace seminarium ze skarbowości i prawa skarbowego oraz ze statystyki" (Seminar working papers in public finance, economic law and statistical analysis).

While in Wilno he became active in the political life of the Second Polish Republic. He was the president of a commission which studied the finances of cities in Poland, which had borrowed funds from American banks for the purposes of economic development and investment in infrastructure. He was elected the Treasury Minister for Wilno Voivodeship.

== World War II ==
During the political trials of 1936 he was a defense lawyer for various leftist student organizations. This role probably contributed to him being placed on a "black list" of Polish intellectuals constructed by Lithuanian collaborators for German Nazi authorities after Wilno was occupied by Germans in 1941. As a result, he was subject to repression during the German occupation, first by being forced out of his house, then along with other Polish professors he was fired from Wilno university. Finally, he was arrested by the Lithuanian Security Police, a Lithuanian Nazi collaborationist police force (also known as Saugumas), and executed by them along with other Polish scientists and professors during the Ponary massacre. He was buried at Ponary.
