= Osiek, Gmina Joniec =

Osiek
- Village
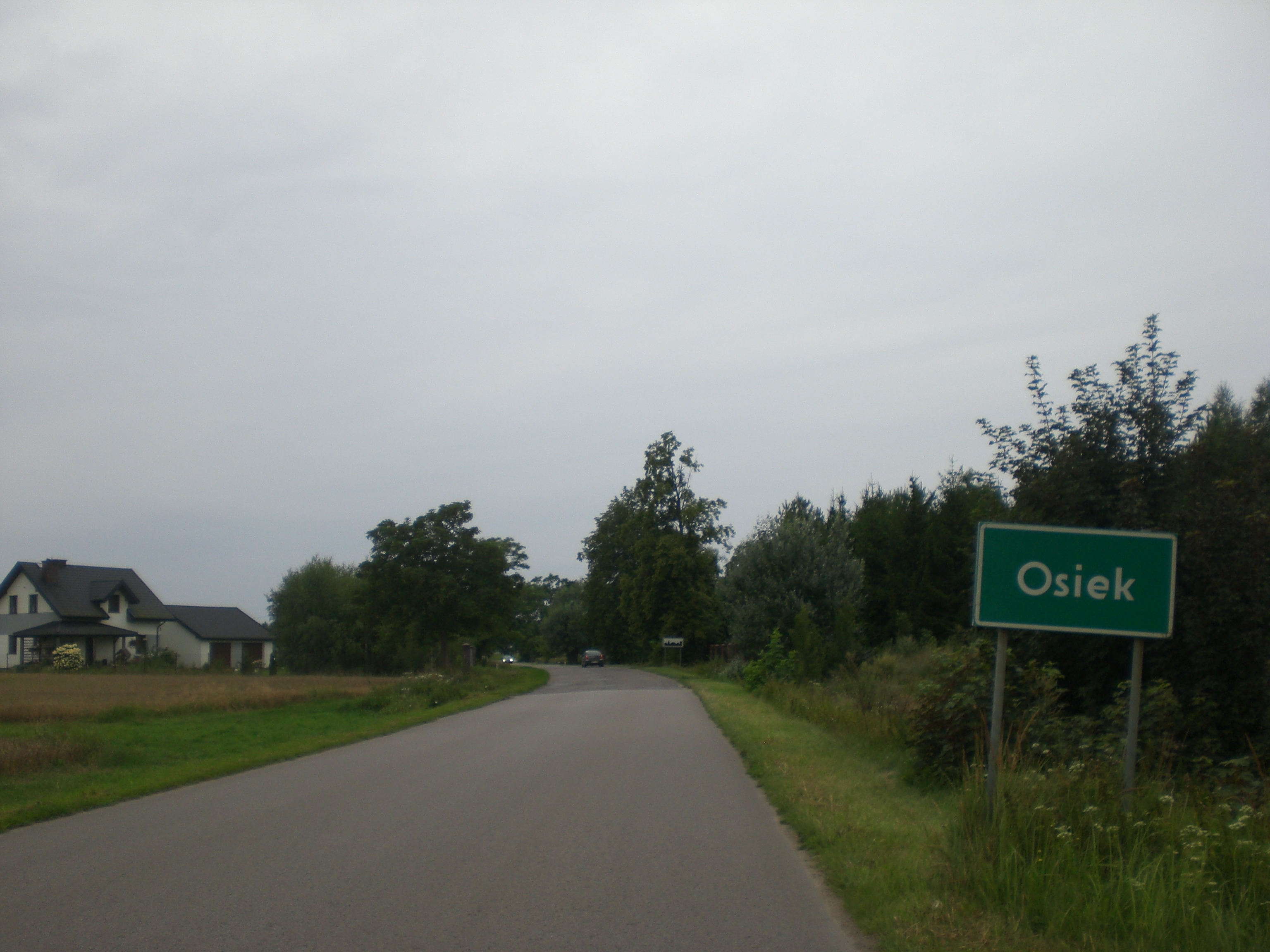

- Location within Poland
- Coordinates: 52°35′39″N 20°32′34″E
- Country: Poland
- Voivodeship: Masovian
- County: Płońsk
- Gmina: Joniec

Osiek [ˈɔɕɛk] is a village in the administrative district of Gmina Joniec, within Płońsk County, Masovian Voivodeship, in east-central Poland.

This gentry village ("wieś szlachecka", i.e., owned by a noble) became part of the Zakroczymska land in the second half of the XVI. Between 1975 and 1998, this place belonged to the Ciechanów Voivodeship.
