= Proboszczewice =

- Village
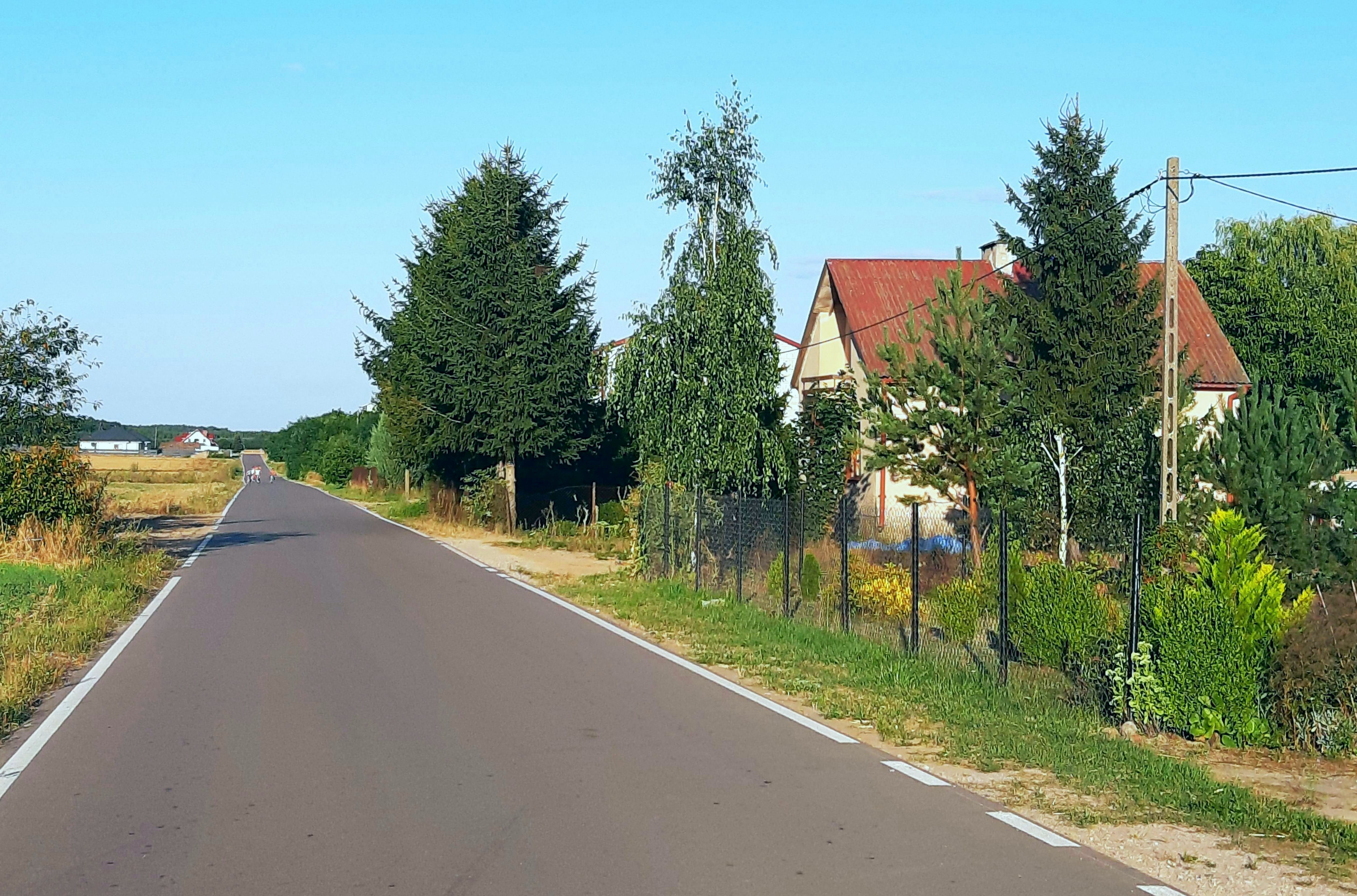
- Road in Proboszczewice in 2020

- Location within Poland
- Coordinates: 52°33′53″N 20°32′17″E
- Country: Poland
- Voivodeship: Masovian
- County: Płońsk
- Gmina: Joniec
- Population (approx.): 200

Proboszczewice [prɔbɔʂt͡ʂɛˈvit͡sɛ] is a village in the administrative district of Gmina Joniec, within Płońsk County, Masovian Voivodeship, in east-central Poland.
