= Ludwikowo, Płońsk County =

Ludwikowo
- Village
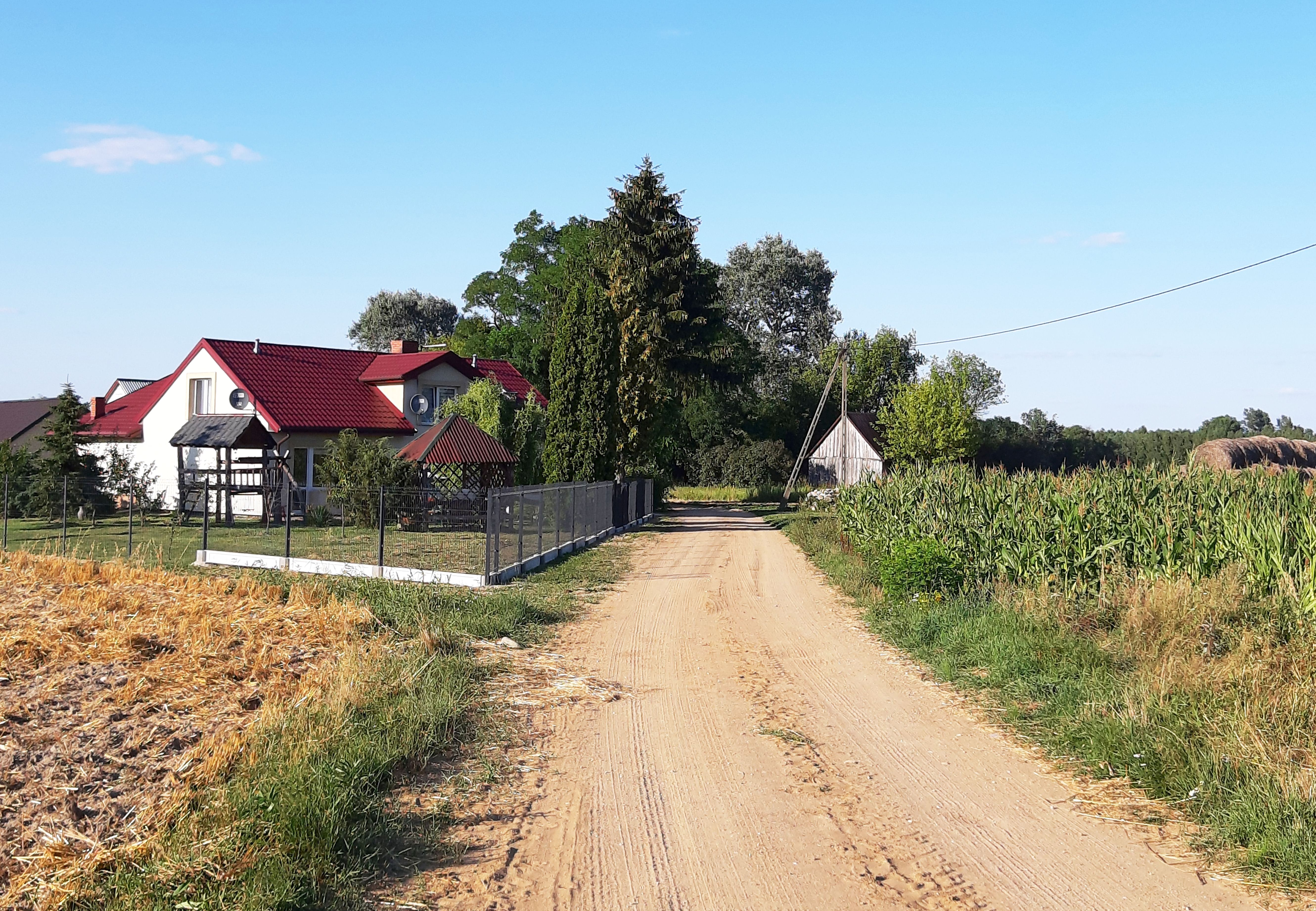
- Dirt road in Ludwikowo in 2020

- Location within Poland
- Coordinates: 52°32′55″N 20°34′16″E
- Country: Poland
- Voivodeship: Masovian
- County: Płońsk
- Gmina: Joniec

Ludwikowo [ludviˈkɔvɔ] is a village in the administrative district of Gmina Joniec, within Płońsk County, Masovian Voivodeship, in east-central Poland.
