= Nowe Wrońska =

- Village
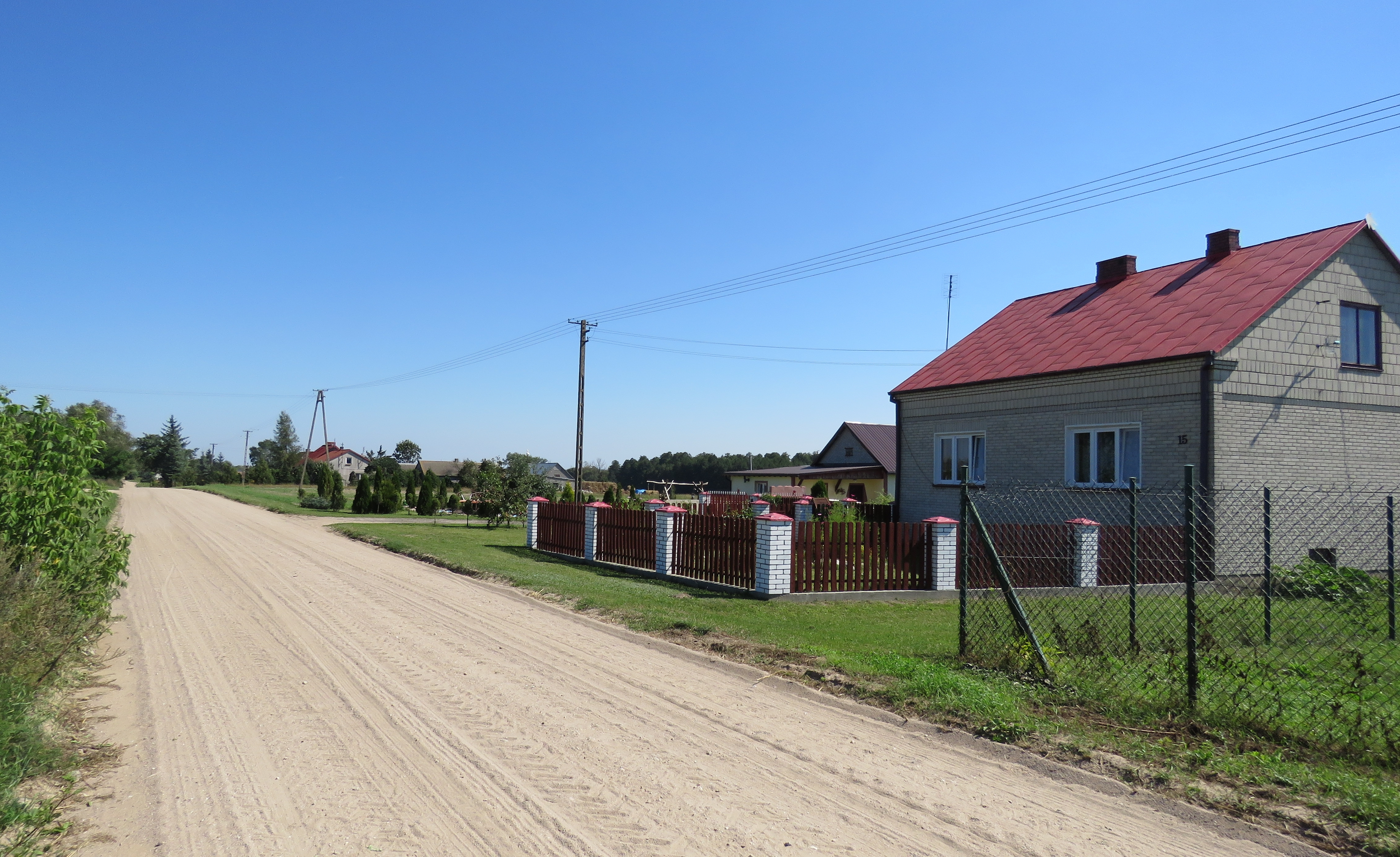

- Location within Poland
- Coordinates: 52°33′53″N 20°30′37″E
- Country: Poland
- Voivodeship: Masovian
- County: Płońsk
- Gmina: Załuski

Nowe Wrońska [ˈnɔvɛ ˈvrɔɲska] is a village in the administrative district of Gmina Załuski, within Płońsk County, Masovian Voivodeship, in east-central Poland.
