= Popielżyn Górny =

- Village
- Location within Poland
- Coordinates: 52°36′N 20°36′E
- Country: Poland
- Voivodeship: Masovian
- County: Płońsk
- Gmina: Joniec

Popielżyn Górny [pɔˈpjɛlʐɨn ˈɡurnɨ] is a village in the administrative district of Gmina Joniec, within Płońsk County, Masovian Voivodeship, in east-central Poland.
