= Stara Wrona =

- Village
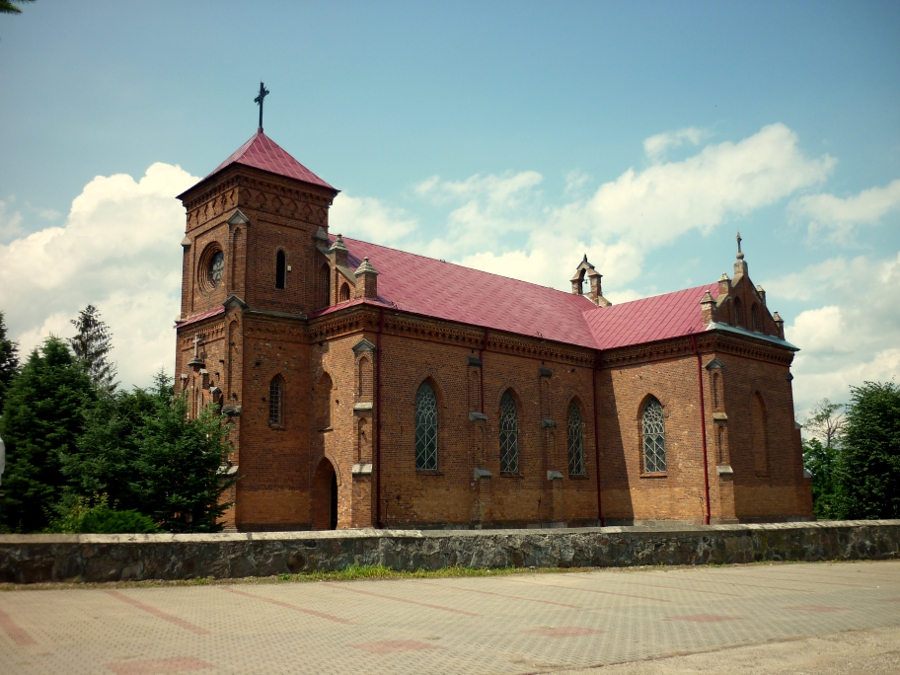
- Church of the Transfiguration in Stara Wrona in 2012

- Location within Poland
- Coordinates: 52°33′38″N 20°35′16″E
- Country: Poland
- Voivodeship: Masovian
- County: Płońsk
- Gmina: Joniec

Stara Wrona [ˈstara ˈvrɔna] is a village in the administrative district of Gmina Joniec, within Płońsk County, Masovian Voivodeship, in east-central Poland.
