= Naborowiec =

- Village
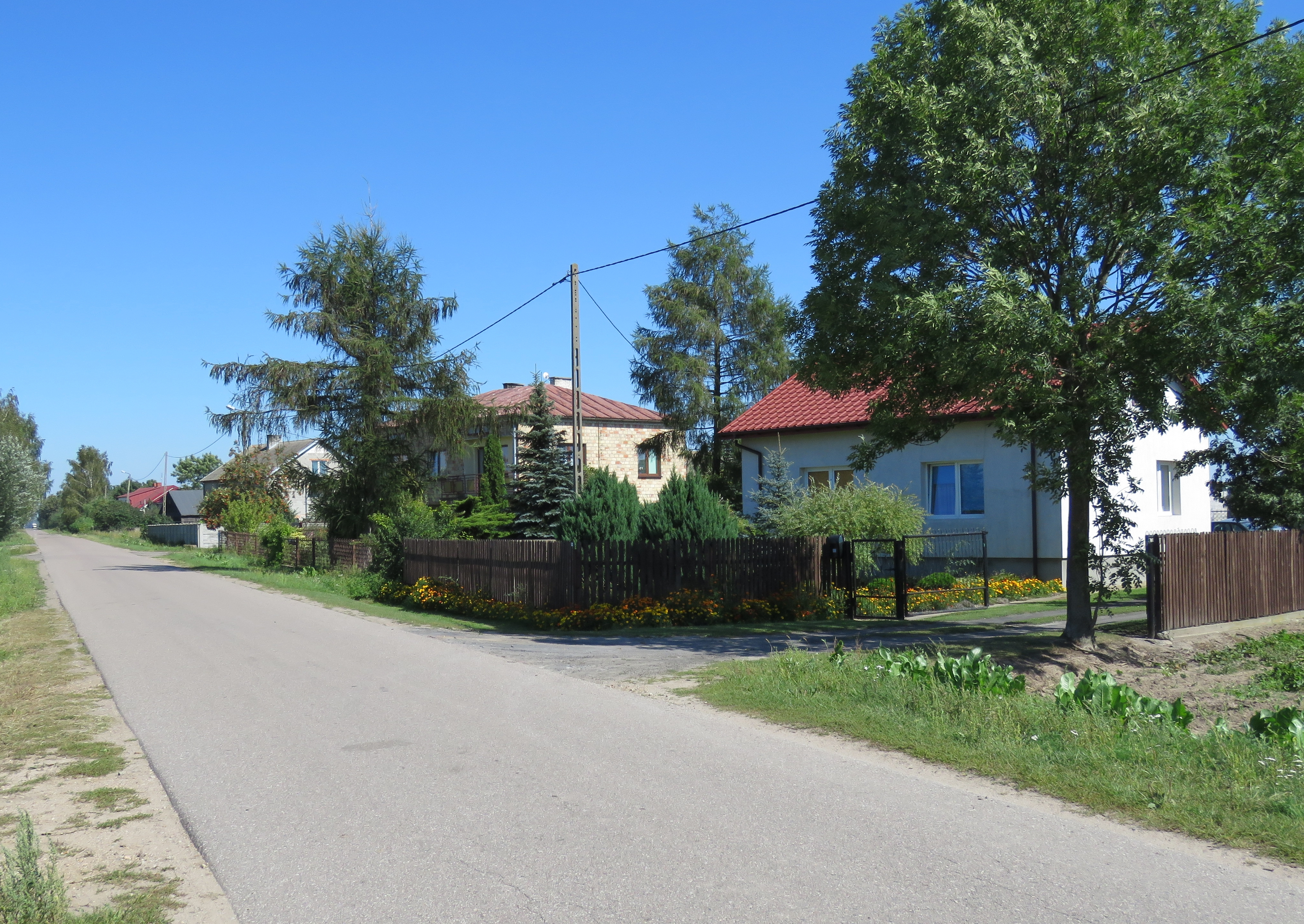

- Location within Poland
- Coordinates: 52°29′N 20°30′E
- Country: Poland
- Voivodeship: Masovian
- County: Płońsk
- Gmina: Załuski

Naborowiec [nabɔˈrɔvjɛt͡s] is a village in the administrative district of Gmina Załuski, within Płońsk County, Masovian Voivodeship, in east-central Poland.
