= Kamienica, Masovian Voivodeship =

Kamienica
- Village
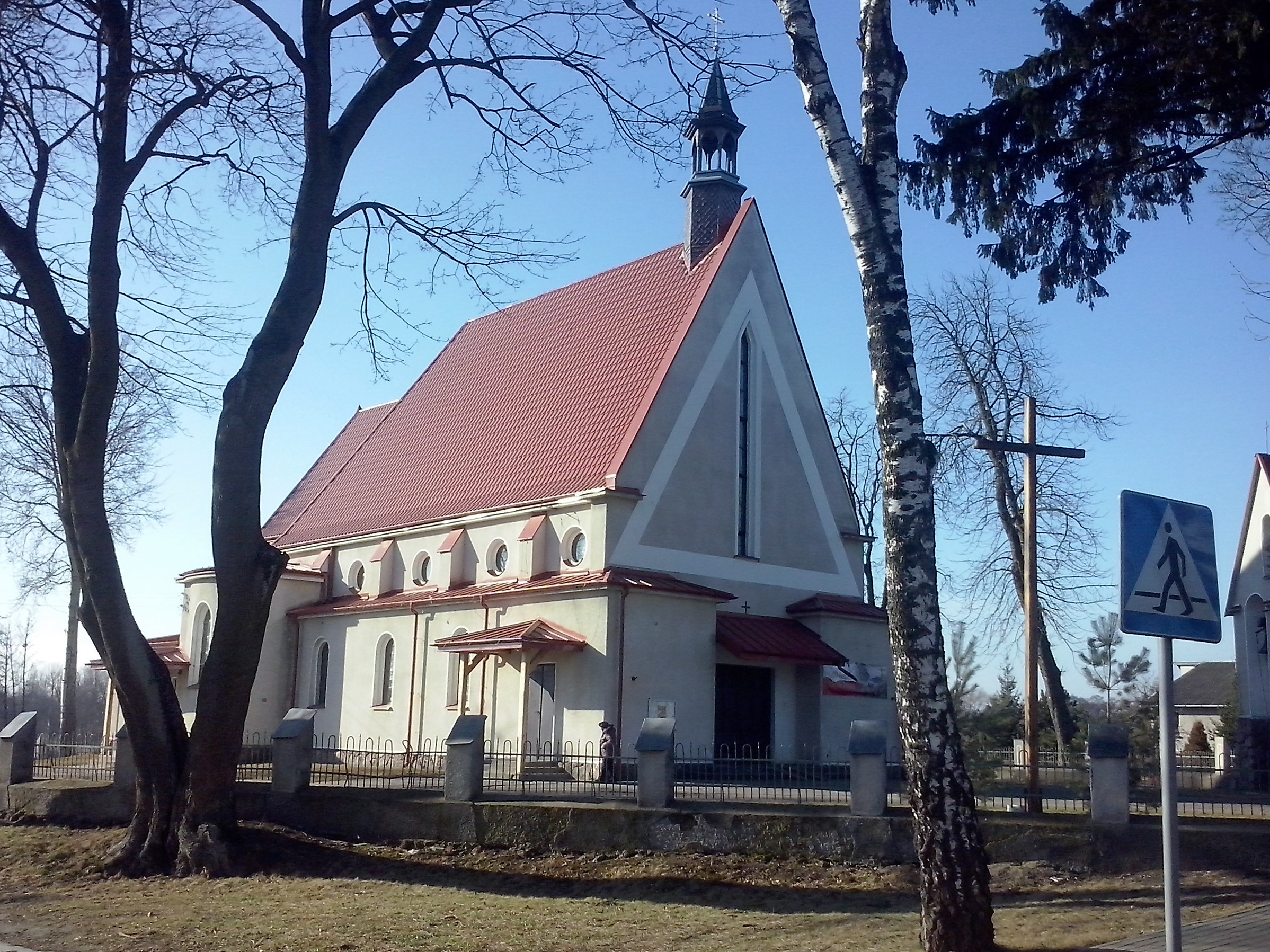
- Providence of God church in Kamienica

- Location within Poland
- Coordinates: 52°27′57″N 20°28′15″E
- Country: Poland
- Voivodeship: Masovian
- County: Płońsk
- Gmina: Załuski

Kamienica [kamjɛˈnit͡sa] is a village in the administrative district of Gmina Załuski, within Płońsk County, Masovian Voivodeship, in east-central Poland.
