= Kroczewo =

- Village
- Location within Poland
- Coordinates: 52°29′N 20°34′E
- Country: Poland
- Voivodeship: Masovian
- County: Płońsk
- Gmina: Załuski
- Population: 202
- Website: http://www.kroczewo.pl

Kroczewo [krɔˈt͡ʂɛvɔ] is a village in the administrative district of Gmina Załuski, within Płońsk County, Masovian Voivodeship, in east-central Poland.

== Transport ==
The S7 expressway bypasses Kroczewo to the east. Exit 55 of the S7 expressway provides for quick access to Gdańsk (295km to the north-west) and Warsaw (48km to the south).

The nearest railway station to Kroczewo is in the town of Płońsk (23km to the north).
