= Adamowo, Gmina Joniec =

Adamowo
- Village
- Location within Poland
- Coordinates: 52°34′15″N 20°36′49″E
- Country: Poland
- Voivodeship: Masovian
- County: Płońsk
- Gmina: Joniec

Adamowo [adaˈmɔvɔ] is a village in the administrative district of Gmina Joniec, within Płońsk County, Masovian Voivodeship, in east-central Poland.
