= Przyborowice Dolne =

- Village
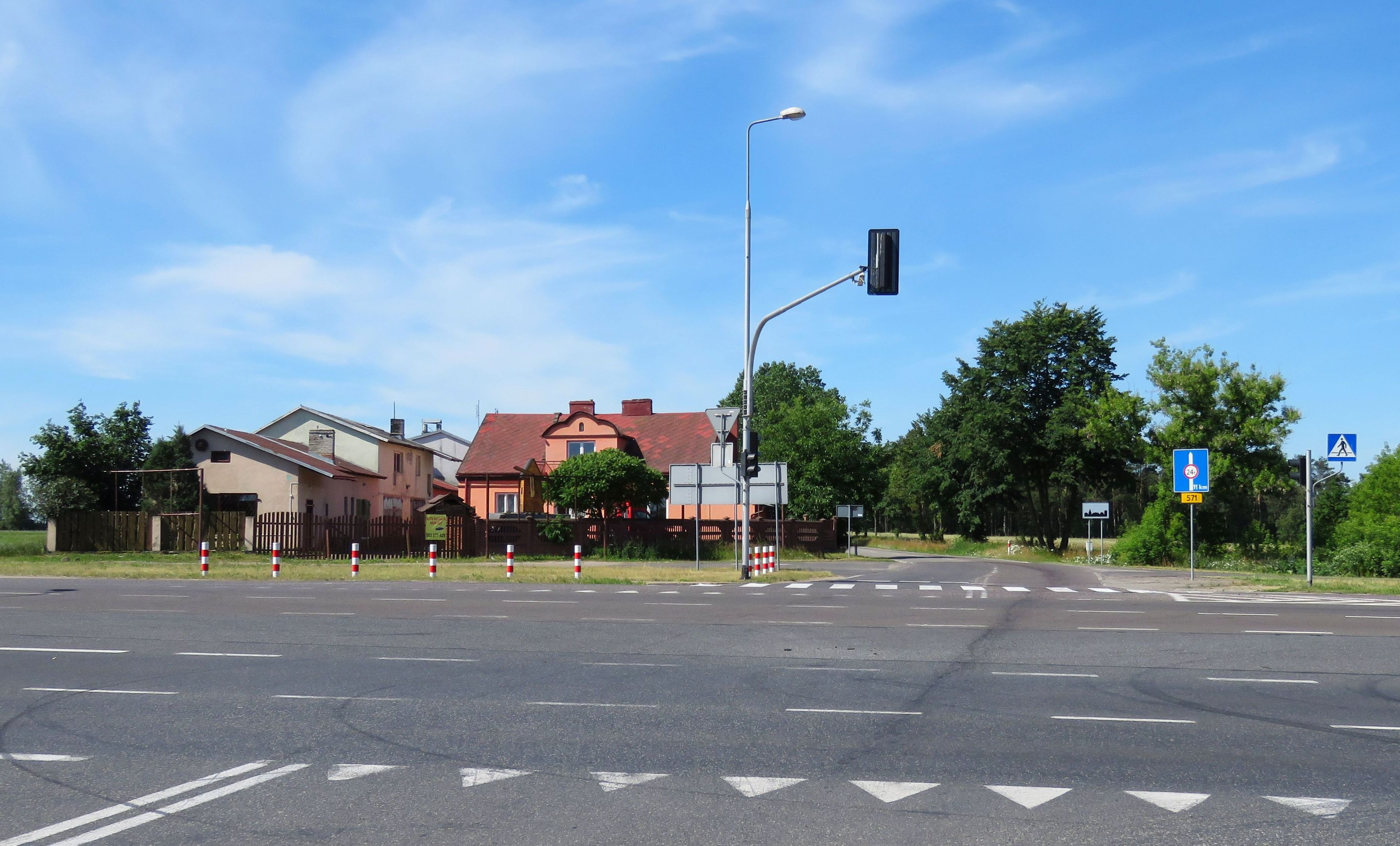

- Location within Poland
- Coordinates: 52°32′32″N 20°29′21″E
- Country: Poland
- Voivodeship: Masovian
- County: Płońsk
- Gmina: Załuski

Przyborowice Dolne [pʂɨbɔrɔˈvit͡sɛ ˈdɔlnɛ] is a village in the administrative district of Gmina Załuski, within Płońsk County, Masovian Voivodeship, in east-central Poland.
