= Soboklęszcz, Płońsk County =

Soboklęszcz
- Village
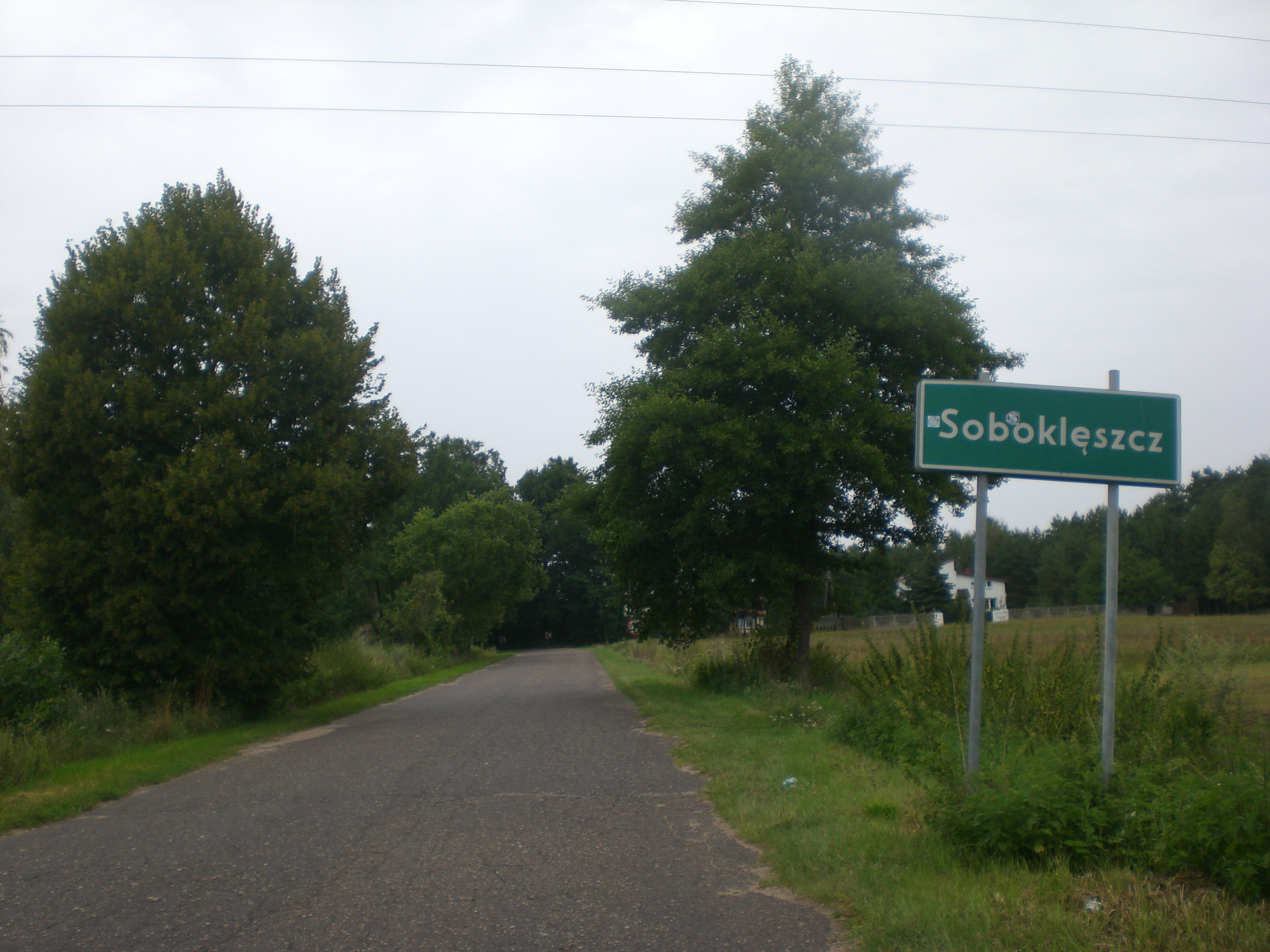

- Location within Poland
- Coordinates: 52°36′04″N 20°31′06″E
- Country: Poland
- Voivodeship: Masovian
- County: Płońsk
- Gmina: Joniec
- Population (approx.): 200

Soboklęszcz [sɔˈbɔklɛ̃ʂt͡ʂ] is a village in the administrative district of Gmina Joniec, within Płońsk County, Masovian Voivodeship, in east-central Poland.
