= Stare Olszyny =

- Village
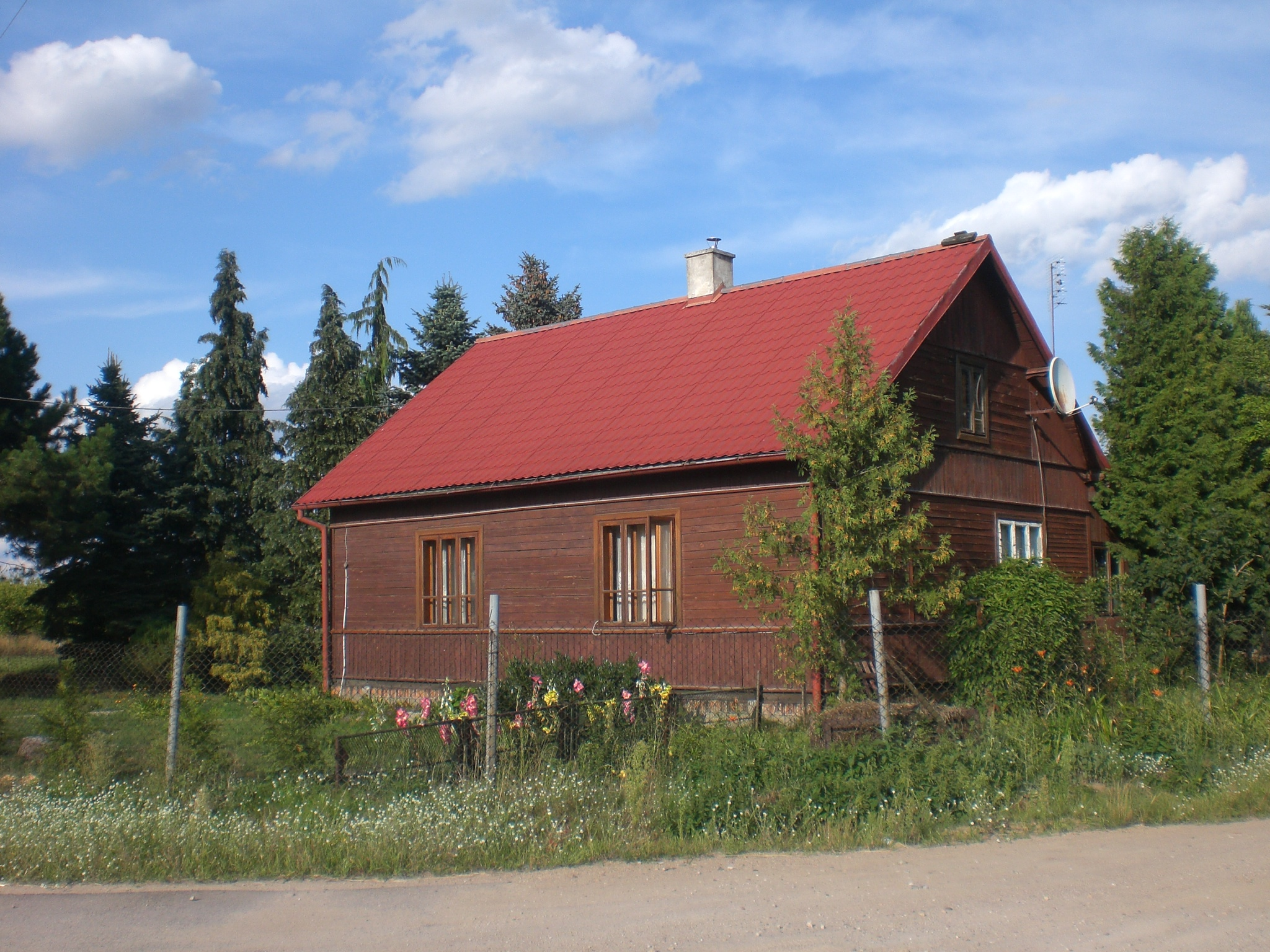

- Location within Poland
- Coordinates: 52°31′17″N 20°28′24″E
- Country: Poland
- Voivodeship: Masovian
- County: Płońsk
- Gmina: Załuski

Stare Olszyny [ˈstarɛ ɔlˈʂɨnɨ] is a village in the administrative district of Gmina Załuski, within Płońsk County, Masovian Voivodeship, in east-central Poland.
