= Sabeckis =

Sabeckis is a Lithuanian surname. Notable people with the surname include:

- Donatas Sabeckis (born 1992), Lithuanian basketball player
- Gvidas Sabeckis (born 1984), Lithuanian tennis player

== See also ==
- Sobieski (disambiguation)
