= Nowa Wrona, Płońsk County =

Nowa Wrona
- Village
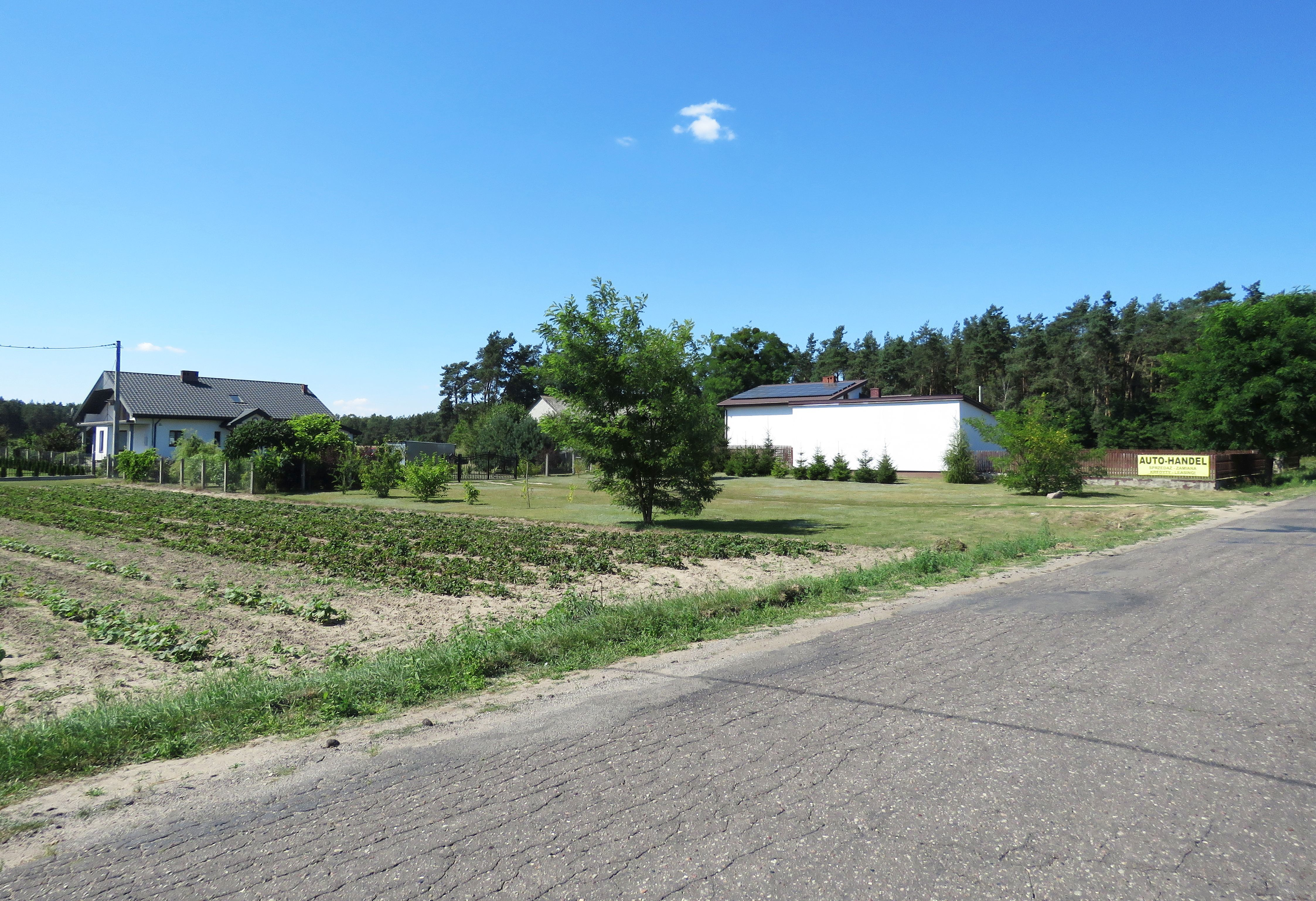
- Street in Nowa Wrona in 2020

- Location within Poland
- Coordinates: 52°32′09″N 20°35′59″E
- Country: Poland
- Voivodeship: Masovian
- County: Płońsk
- Gmina: Joniec

Nowa Wrona [ˈnɔva ˈvrɔna] is a village in the administrative district of Gmina Joniec, within Płońsk County, Masovian Voivodeship, in east-central Poland.

== History ==
Before World War II, there were two estates here. The first larger one is Nowa Wrona with an area of 95.05 ha. it belonged to Hersz Segen. The second estate, smaller Nowa-Wrona Lit "H", with an area of 60.66 ha. it belonged to Kazimierz Salamonowicz. Here was born in 1907 year Lieutenant Mieczyslaw Salamonowicz murdered by soviets in Katyń (1940).
