= Koryciska, Płońsk County =

Koryciska
- Village
- Location within Poland
- Coordinates: 52°32′N 20°34′E
- Country: Poland
- Voivodeship: Masovian
- County: Płońsk
- Gmina: Załuski

Koryciska [kɔrɨˈt͡ɕiska] is a village in the administrative district of Gmina Załuski, within Płońsk County, Masovian Voivodeship, in east-central Poland.
