= Joniec-Kolonia =

- Village
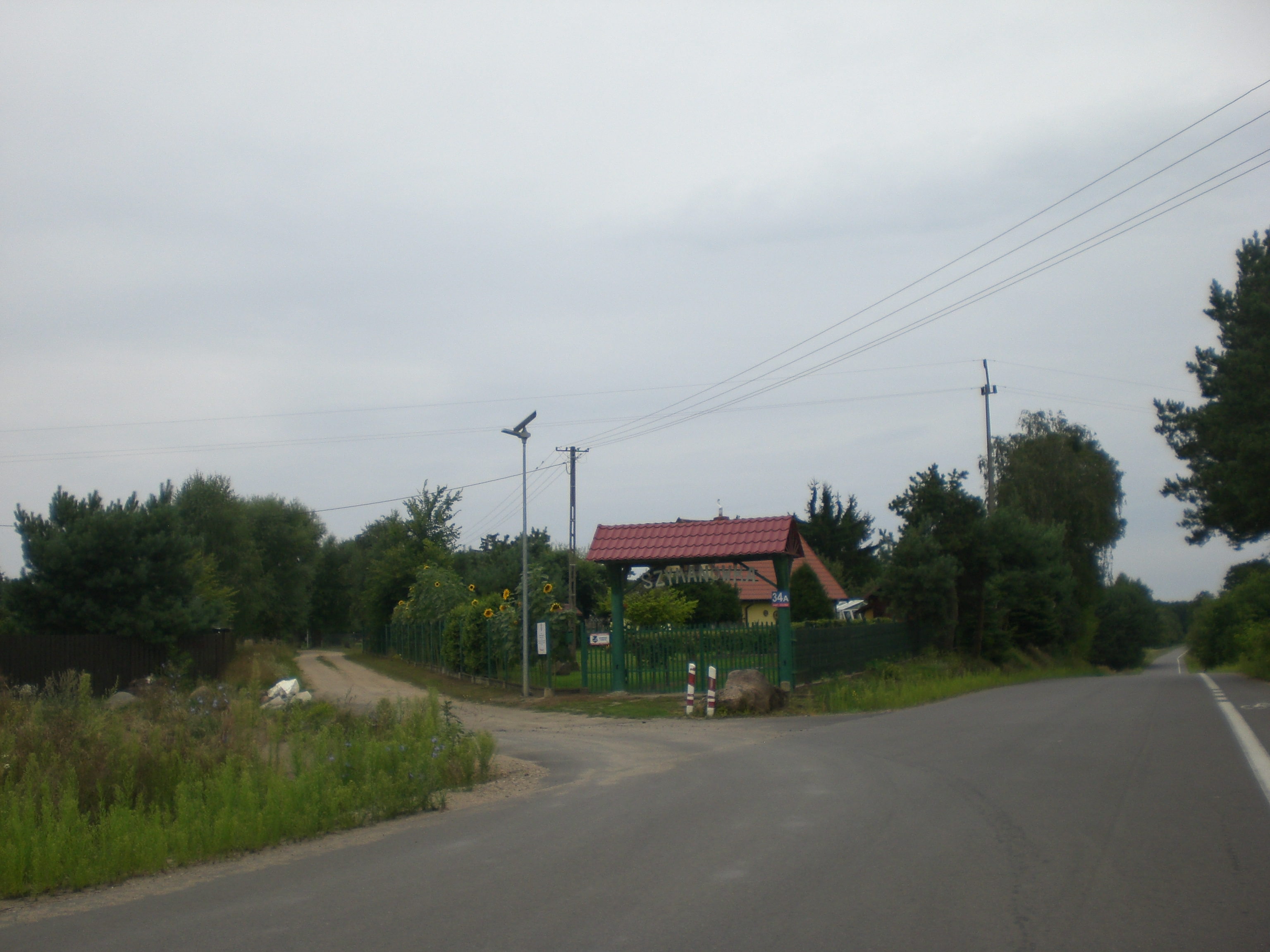
- Street in Joniec-Kolonia in 2023

- Location within Poland
- Coordinates: 52°35′45″N 20°33′15″E
- Country: Poland
- Voivodeship: Masovian
- County: Płońsk
- Gmina: Joniec
- Population: 120

Joniec-Kolonia [ˈjɔɲɛt͡s kɔˈlɔɲa] is a village in the administrative district of Gmina Joniec, within Płońsk County, Masovian Voivodeship, in east-central Poland.
