= Królewo =

Królewo may refer to the following places:

- Królewo, Masovian Voivodeship (east-central Poland)
- Królewo, Pomeranian Voivodeship (north Poland)
- Królewo, Warmian-Masurian Voivodeship (north Poland)
- Królewo, West Pomeranian Voivodeship (north-west Poland)
