= Popielżyn-Zawady =

- Village
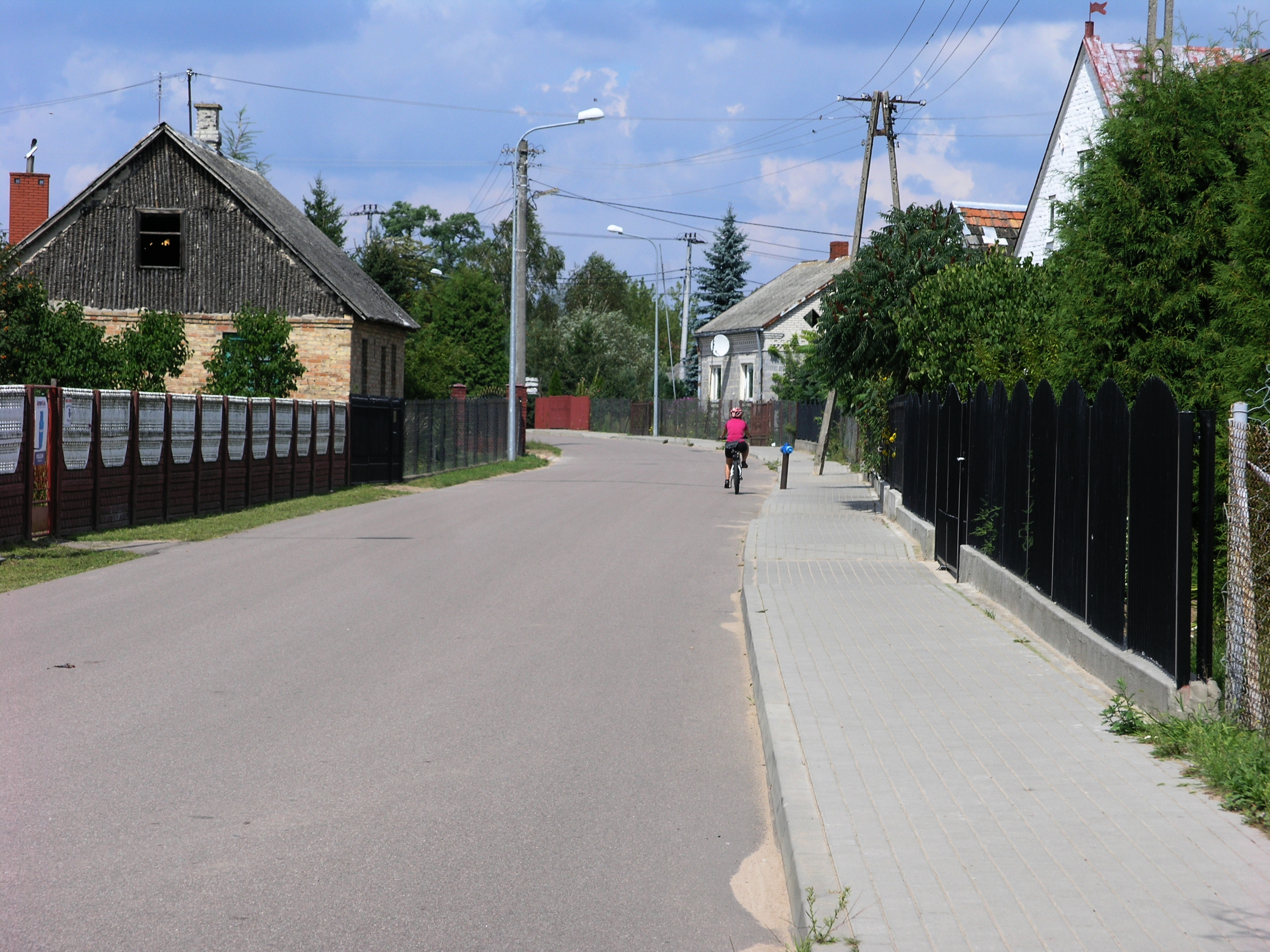
- Popielżyn-Zawady (2014)

- Location within Poland
- Coordinates: 52°35′26″N 20°36′55″E
- Country: Poland
- Voivodeship: Masovian
- County: Płońsk
- Gmina: Joniec

Popielżyn-Zawady [pɔˈpjɛlʐɨn zaˈvadɨ] is a village in the administrative district of Gmina Joniec, within Płońsk County, Masovian Voivodeship, in east-central Poland.
