= Omięciny =

- Village
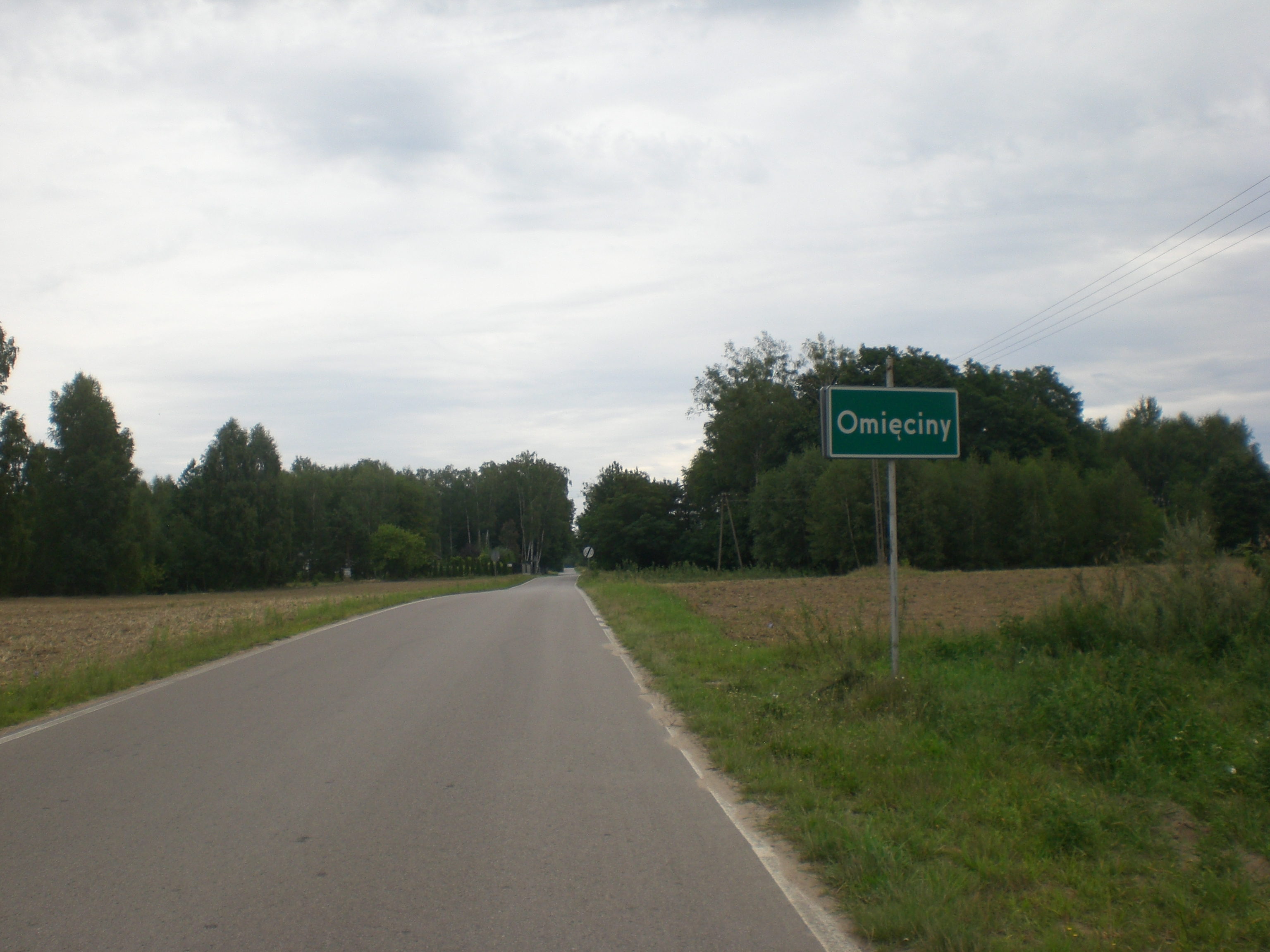

- Location within Poland
- Coordinates: 52°33′59″N 20°33′52″E
- Country: Poland
- Voivodeship: Masovian
- County: Płońsk
- Gmina: Joniec

Omięciny [ɔmjɛnˈt͡ɕinɨ] is a village in the administrative district of Gmina Joniec, within Płońsk County, Masovian Voivodeship, in east-central Poland.
