= Michałówek, Płońsk County =

Michałówek
- Village
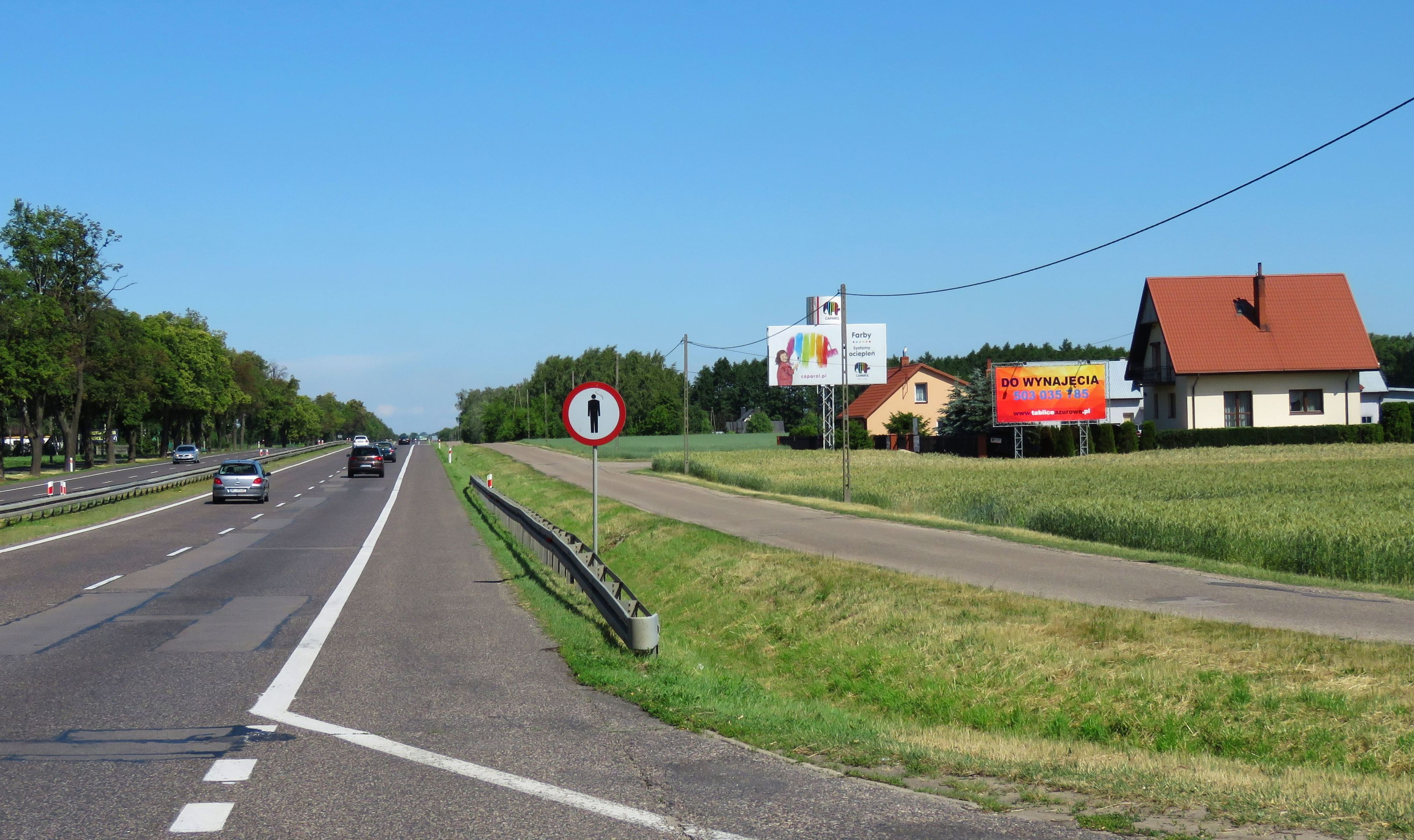

- Location within Poland
- Coordinates: 52°32′07″N 20°30′52″E
- Country: Poland
- Voivodeship: Masovian
- County: Płońsk
- Gmina: Załuski

Michałówek [mixaˈwuvɛk] is a village in the administrative district of Gmina Załuski, within Płońsk County, Masovian Voivodeship, in east-central Poland.
