= Nowe Olszyny =

- Village
- Location within Poland
- Coordinates: 52°32′04″N 20°27′57″E
- Country: Poland
- Voivodeship: Masovian
- County: Płońsk
- Gmina: Załuski

Nowe Olszyny [ˈnɔvɛ ɔlˈʂɨnɨ] is a village in the administrative district of Gmina Załuski, within Płońsk County, Masovian Voivodeship, in east-central Poland.
