= Krajęczyn =

- Village
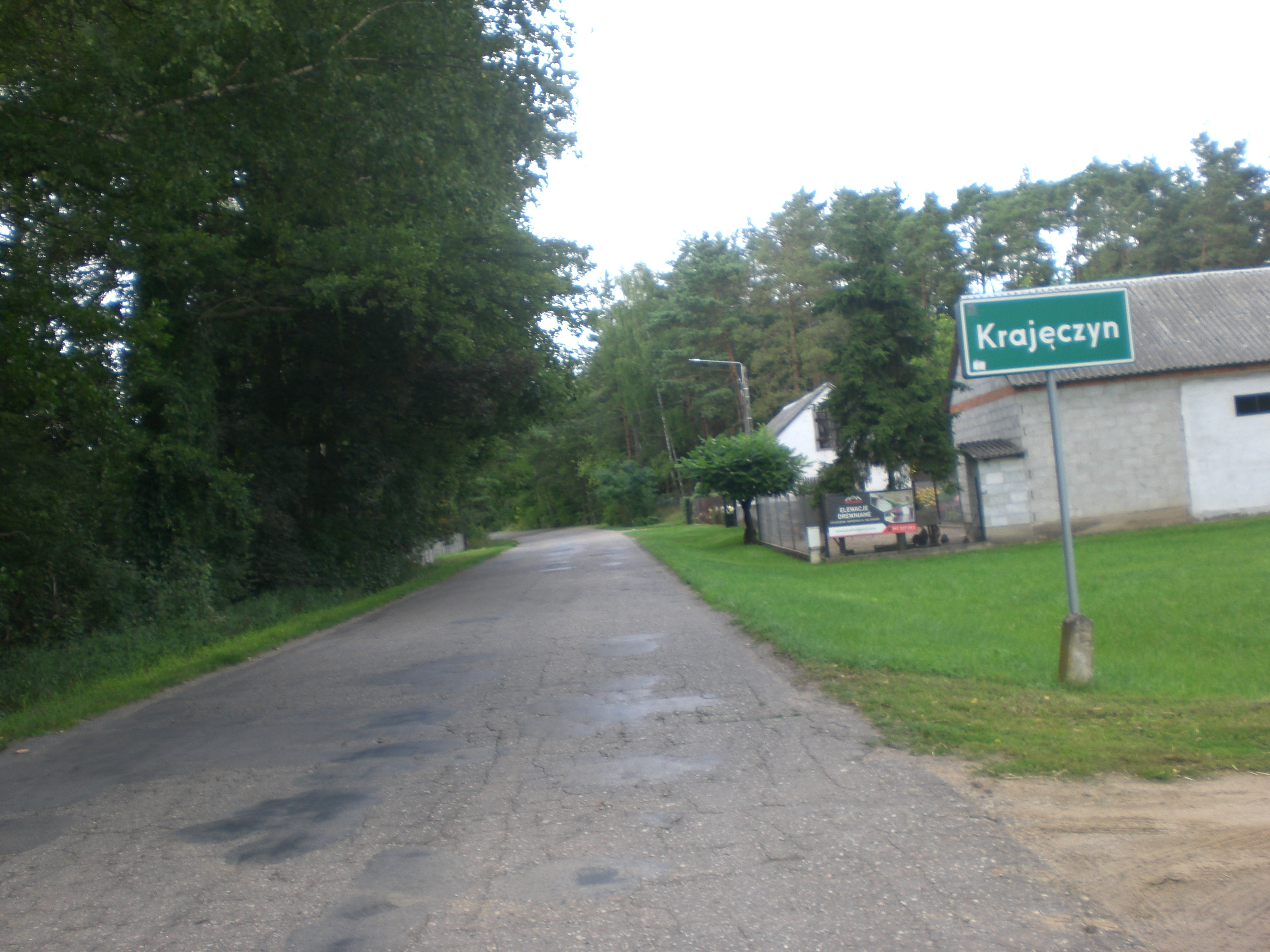

- Location within Poland
- Coordinates: 52°37′10″N 20°34′51″E
- Country: Poland
- Voivodeship: Masovian
- County: Płońsk
- Gmina: Joniec
- Population: 180

Krajęczyn [kraˈjɛnt͡ʂɨn] is a village in the administrative district of Gmina Joniec, within Płońsk County, Masovian Voivodeship, in east-central Poland.
