= Naborowo =

- Village
- Location within Poland
- Coordinates: 52°29′42″N 20°27′52″E
- Country: Poland
- Voivodeship: Masovian
- County: Płońsk
- Gmina: Załuski

Naborowo [nabɔˈrɔvɔ] is a village in the administrative district of Gmina Załuski, within Płońsk County, Masovian Voivodeship, in east-central Poland.
