= Kamienica-Wygoda =

- Village
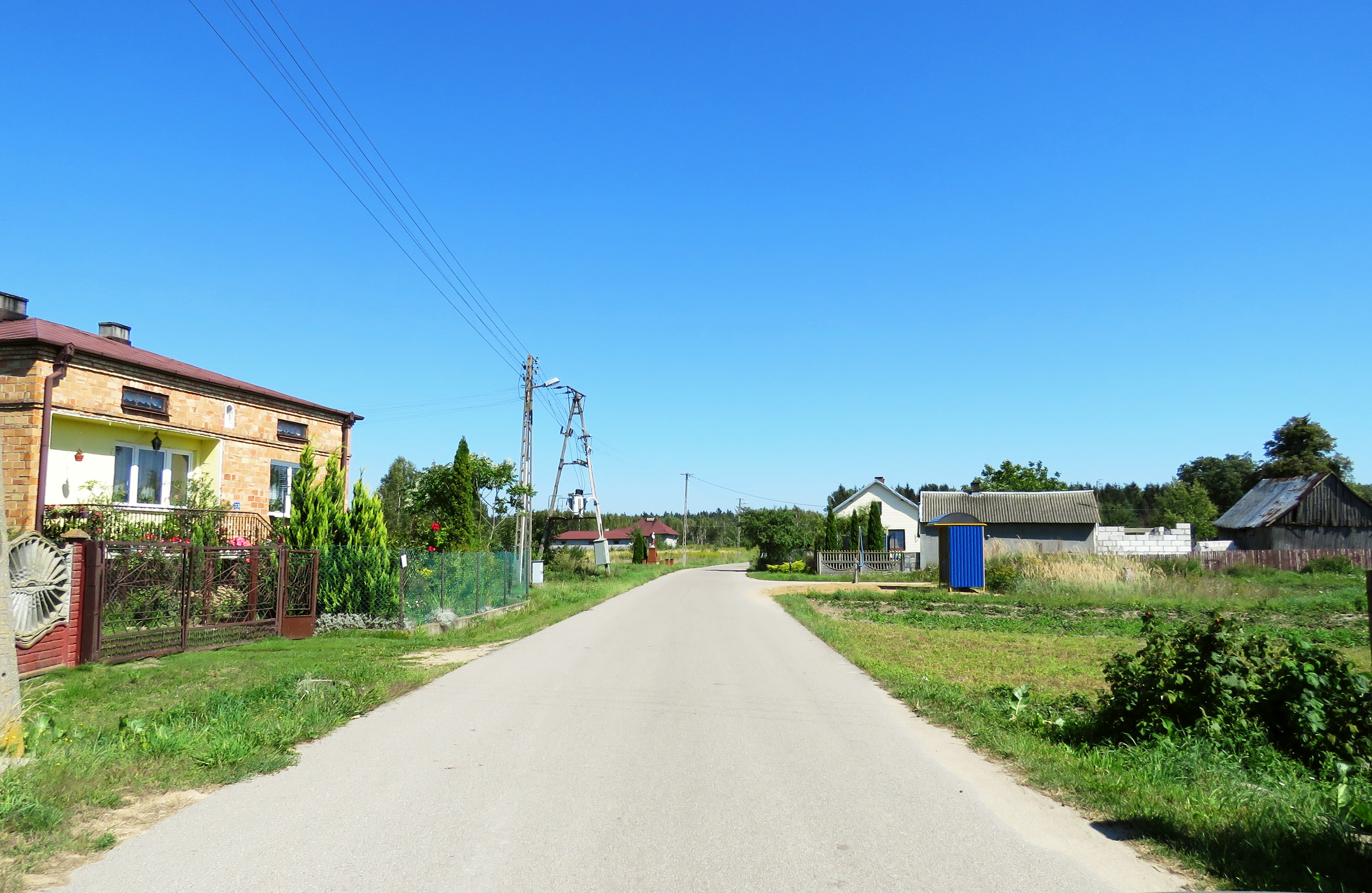

- Location within Poland
- Coordinates: 52°26′46″N 20°29′54″E
- Country: Poland
- Voivodeship: Masovian
- County: Płońsk
- Gmina: Załuski

Kamienica-Wygoda [kamjɛˈnit͡sa vɨˈɡɔda] is a village in the administrative district of Gmina Załuski, within Płońsk County, Masovian Voivodeship, in east-central Poland.
