= Stróżewo, Masovian Voivodeship =

Stróżewo
- Village
- Location within Poland
- Coordinates: 52°55′53″N 16°54′22″E
- Country: Poland
- Voivodeship: Masovian
- County: Płońsk
- Gmina: Załuski

Stróżewo [struˈʐɛvɔ] is a village in the administrative district of Gmina Załuski, within Płońsk County, Masovian Voivodeship, in east-central Poland.
