= Zdunowo, Masovian Voivodeship =

Zdunowo
- Village
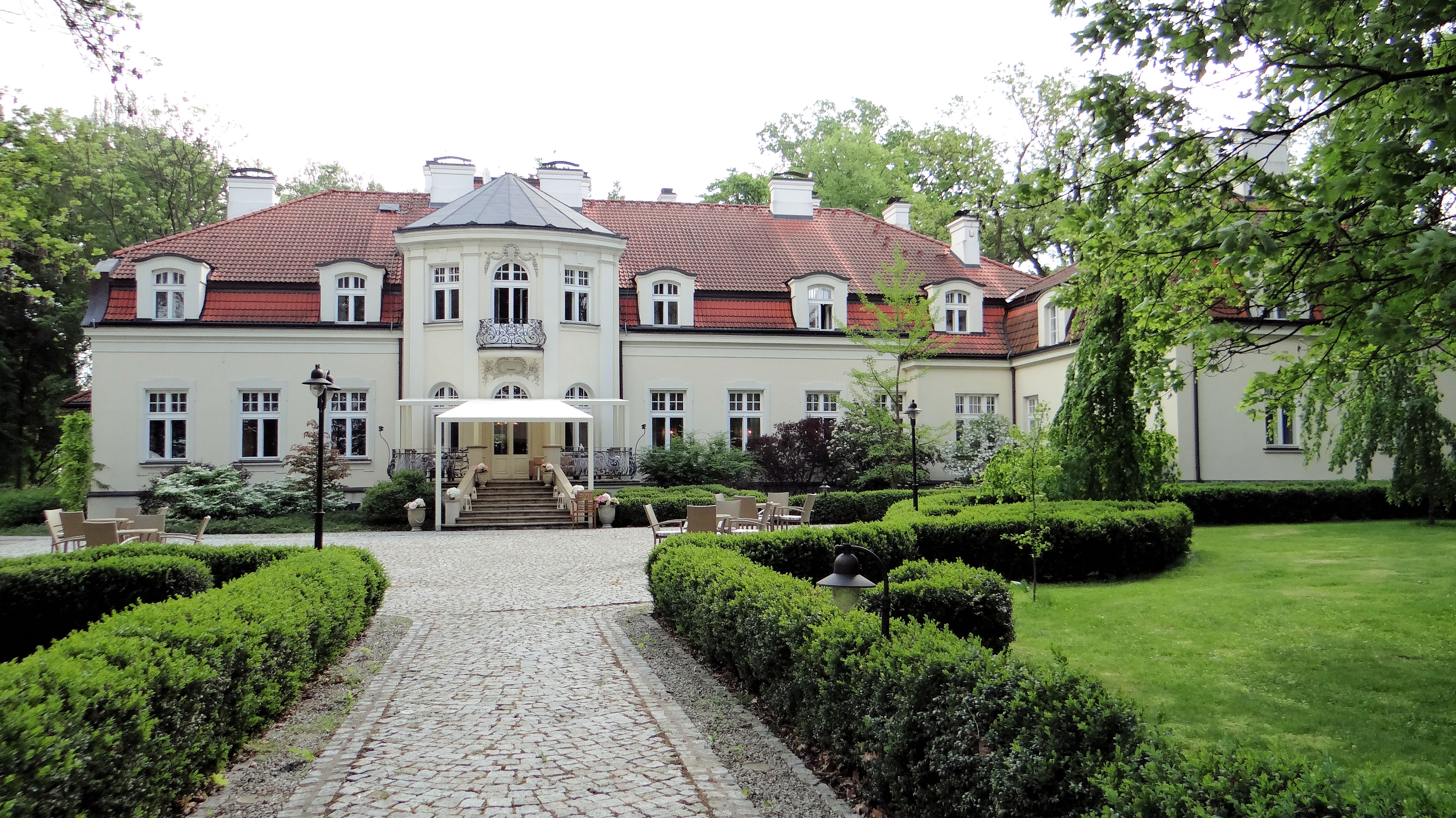
- Palace in Zdunowo

- Location within Poland
- Coordinates: 52°30′17″N 20°30′54″E
- Country: Poland
- Voivodeship: Masovian
- County: Płońsk
- Gmina: Załuski

Zdunowo [zduˈnɔvɔ] is a village in the administrative district of Gmina Załuski, within Płońsk County, Masovian Voivodeship, in east-central Poland.
