= Karolinowo, Gmina Załuski =

Karolinowo
- Village
- Location within Poland
- Coordinates: 52°33′6″N 20°32′43″E
- Country: Poland
- Voivodeship: Masovian
- County: Płońsk
- Gmina: Załuski
- Population: 130

Karolinowo [karɔliˈnɔvɔ] is a village in the administrative district of Gmina Załuski, within Płońsk County, Masovian Voivodeship, in east-central Poland.
