= Szczytniki, Masovian Voivodeship =

Szczytniki
- Village
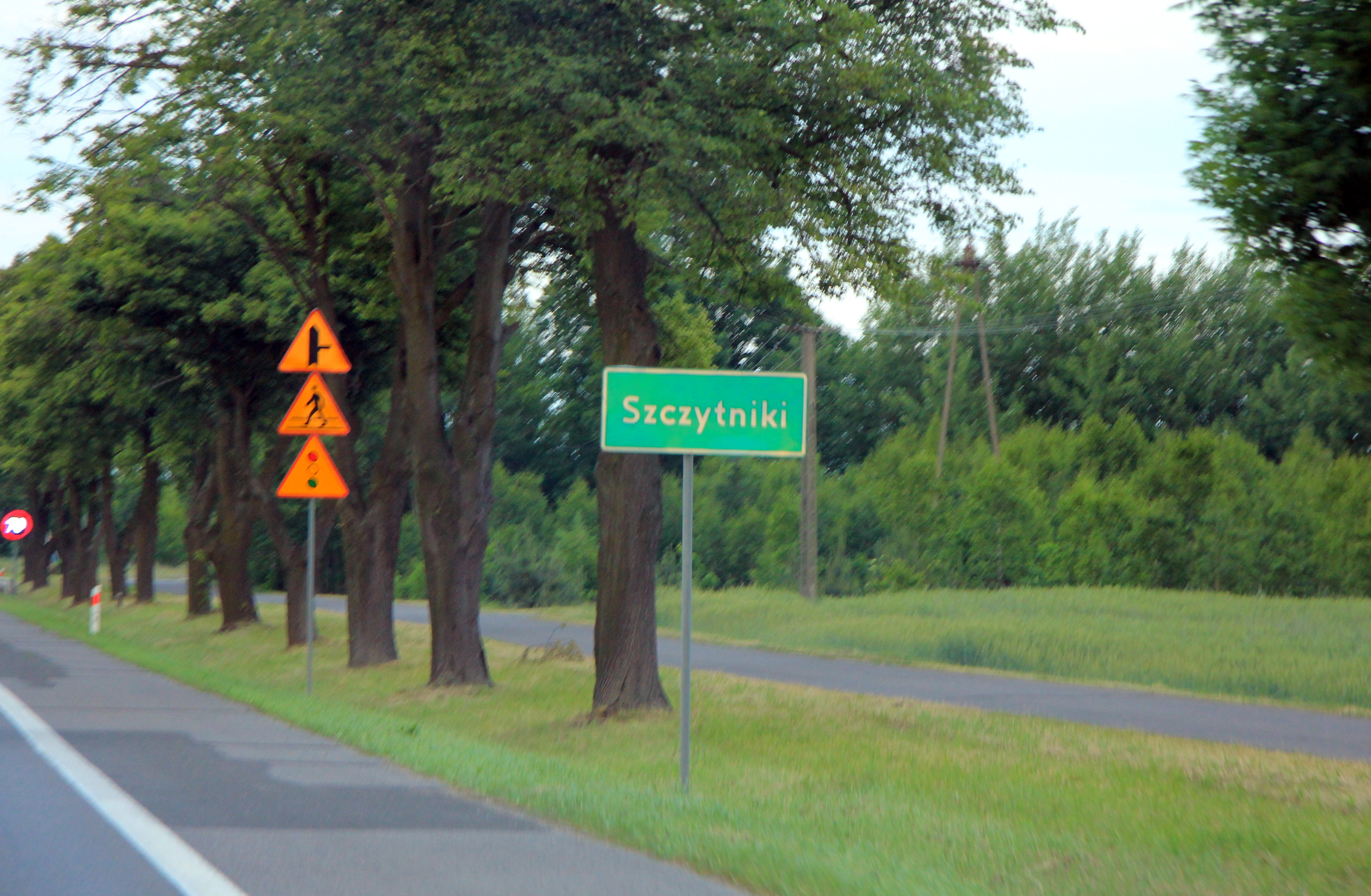

- Location within Poland
- Coordinates: 52°34′30″N 20°28′01″E
- Country: Poland
- Voivodeship: Masovian
- County: Płońsk
- Gmina: Załuski

Szczytniki [ʂt͡ʂɨtˈniki] is a village in the administrative district of Gmina Załuski, within Płońsk County, Masovian Voivodeship, in east-central Poland.
