= Sadowiec =

Sadowiec may refer to the following places in Poland:

- Sadowiec, Kuyavian-Pomeranian Voivodeship
- Sadowiec, Łódź Voivodeship
- Sadówiec, Masovian Voivodeship
