= Sobieski =

Sobieski (singular masculine; singular feminine: Sobieska; plural: Sobiescy) is a Polish noble family name, and may refer to:

== People ==
- Sobieski family, or the House of Sobieski, a notable family of Polish nobility, whose members included:
  - Marek Sobieski (1549/1550–1605), voivode of Lublin, father of Jakub Sobieski
  - Jakub Sobieski (1590–1646), father of King John III Sobieski
  - John III Sobieski (1629–1696), King of the Polish–Lithuanian Commonwealth from 1674 to 1696
  - Aleksander Benedykt Sobieski (1677–1714), son of King John III Sobieski
  - Jakub Ludwik Sobieski (James Louis Henry Sobieski (1667–1737), son of King John III Sobieski and last male line descendant of Marek Sobieski
  - Teofila Zofia Sobieska (1607–1661)
  - Katarzyna Sobieska (1634–1694)
  - Konstanty Władysław Sobieski (1680–1726)
  - Maria Teresa Sobieska (1673–1675)
  - Teresa Kunegunda Sobieska (1676–1730), Polish princess
  - Maria Klementyna Sobieska (1702–1735), wife of James Francis Edward Stuart, the Old Pretender
  - Maria Teresa Sobieska (1673–1675)
  - Maria Karolina Sobieska (1697–1740), duchess of Bouillon and last surviving member of the family.

Other people with the surname Sobieski:

- Ben Sobieski (born 1979), American football player
- Carol Sobieski (1939–1990), American screenwriter
- Leelee Sobieski (born 1982), American actress
- Wacław Sobieski (1872–1935), Polish historian
- Lidia Sobieska, the Undefeated Karate Warrior and Prime Minister of Poland in Tekken 7 and Tekken 8, a fighting game in Bandai Namco's Tekken franchise.

See also Sobieski Stuarts (1795–1872 & 1802–1880), two brothers who claimed Stuart ancestry.

== Places ==
Poland

- Sobieski, Masovian Voivodeship, in east-central Poland
- Sobieski, Podlaskie Voivodeship, in north-east Poland

United States

- Sobieski, Minnesota, city
- Sobieski, Wisconsin, census-designated place
- Sobieski Corners, Wisconsin, an unincorporated community

== Other uses ==
- Sobieski (train), a EuroCity express train between Vienna and Warsaw
- Sobieski Institute (Instytut Sobieskiego), a Polish think tank
- Sobieski Vodka, Polish vodka
- MS Sobieski, a Polish liner used as a troopship in World War II.
- Sobieski Stuarts
