= Gmina Załuski =

Gmina Załuski Załuski Commune
- Gmina
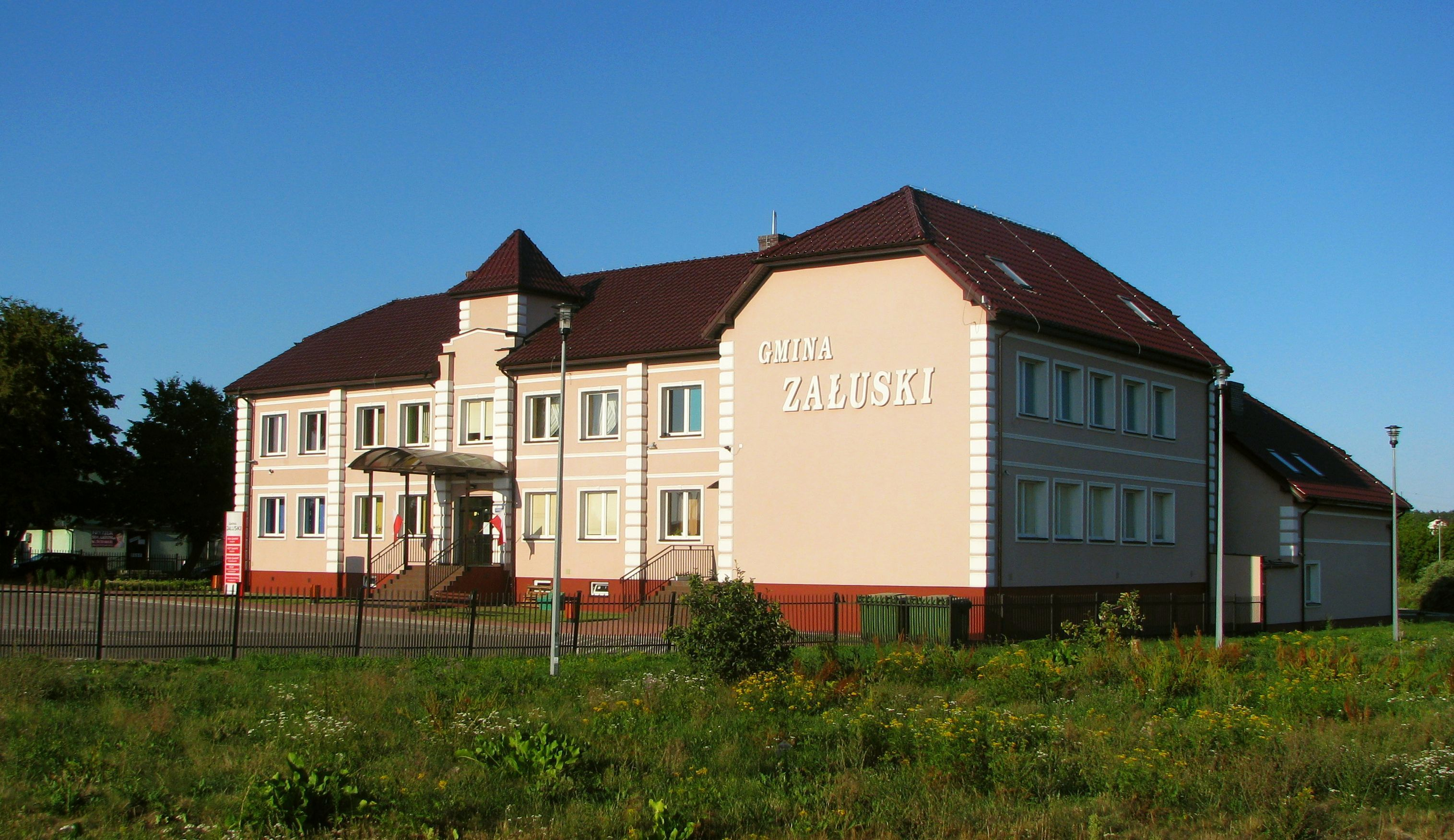
- Municipal office
- Interactive map of Gmina Załuski
- Coordinates (Załuski): 52°30′38″N 20°31′43″E
- Country: Poland
- Voivodeship: Masovian
- County: Płońsk
- Seat: Załuski

Area
  - Total: 111.65 km^{2} (43.11 sq mi)

Population (2013)
  - Total: 5,697
  - Density: 51.03/km^{2} (132.2/sq mi)
- Website: www.zaluski.iap.pl

Gmina Załuski is a rural gmina (administrative district) in Płońsk County, Masovian Voivodeship, in east-central Poland. Its seat is the village of Załuski, which lies approximately 17 kilometres (11 mi) south-east of Płońsk and 46 km (29 mi) north-west of Warsaw.

The gmina covers an area of 111.65 square kilometres (43.1 sq mi), and as of 2006 its total population is 5,431 (5,697 in 2013).

== Villages ==
Gmina Załuski contains the villages and settlements of:

- Falbogi Wielkie
- Gostolin
- Kamienica
- Kamienica-Wygoda
- Karolinowo
- Koryciska
- Kroczewo
- Michałówek
- Naborowiec
- Naborowo
- Niepiekła
- Nowe Olszyny
- Nowe Wrońska
- Przyborowice Dolne
- Przyborowice Górne
- Sadówiec
- Słotwin
- Smólska
- Sobole
- Stare Olszyny
- Stare Wrońska
- Stróżewo
- Szczytniki
- Szczytno
- Wilamy
- Wojny
- Załuski
- Zdunowo
- Złotopolice

== Neighbouring gminas ==
Gmina Załuski is bordered by the gminas of Czerwińsk nad Wisłą, Joniec, Naruszewo, Płońsk and Zakroczym.
