= Joniec =

- Village
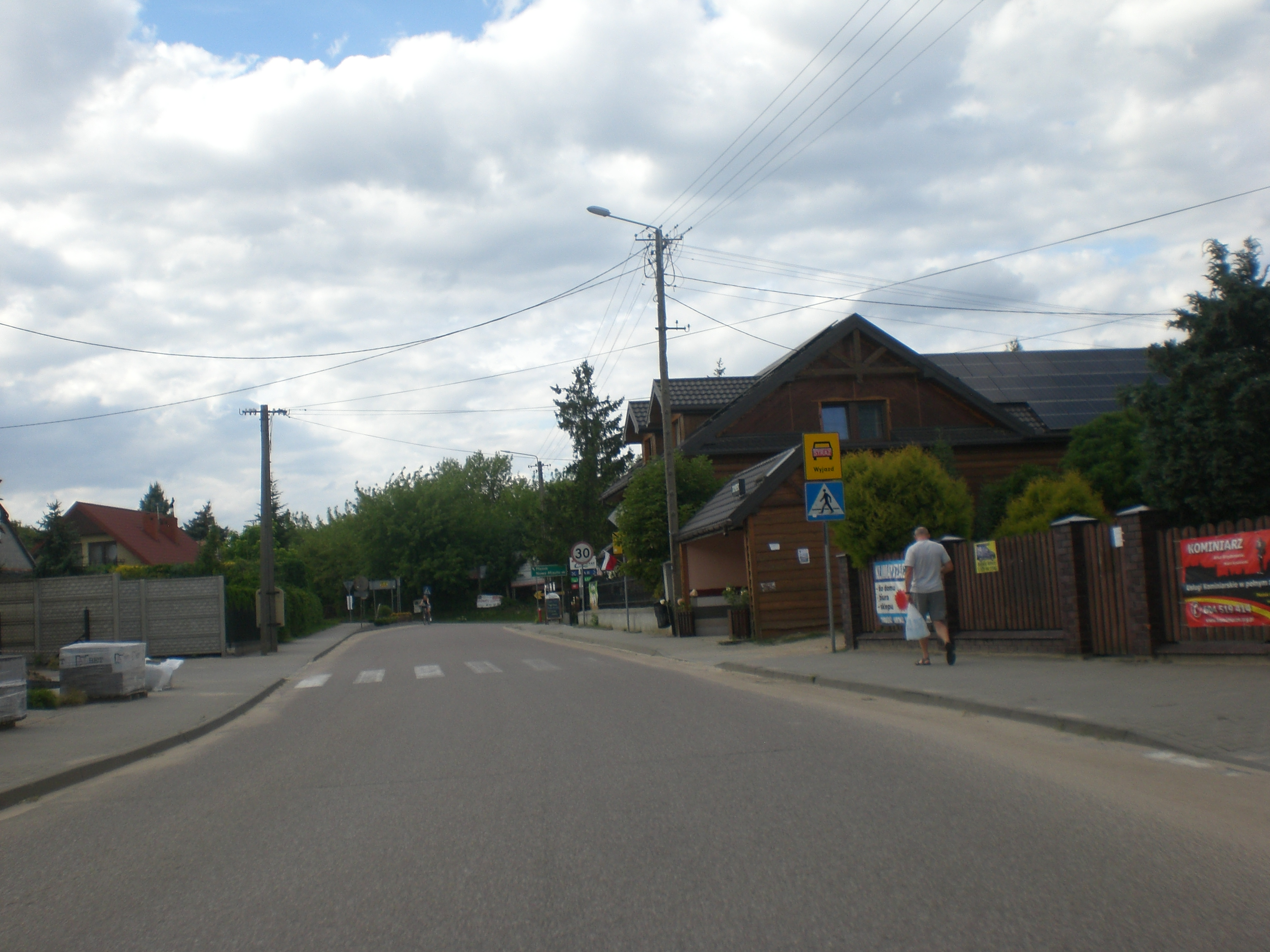
- Street in Joniec in 2023

- Location within Poland
- Coordinates: 52°36′N 20°35′E
- Country: Poland
- Voivodeship: Masovian
- County: Płońsk
- Gmina: Joniec
- Population: 270

Joniec [ˈjɔɲɛt͡s] is a village in Płońsk County, Masovian Voivodeship, in east-central Poland. It is the seat of the gmina (administrative district) called Gmina Joniec.
