= Gmina Joniec =

Gmina Joniec Joniec Commune
- Gmina
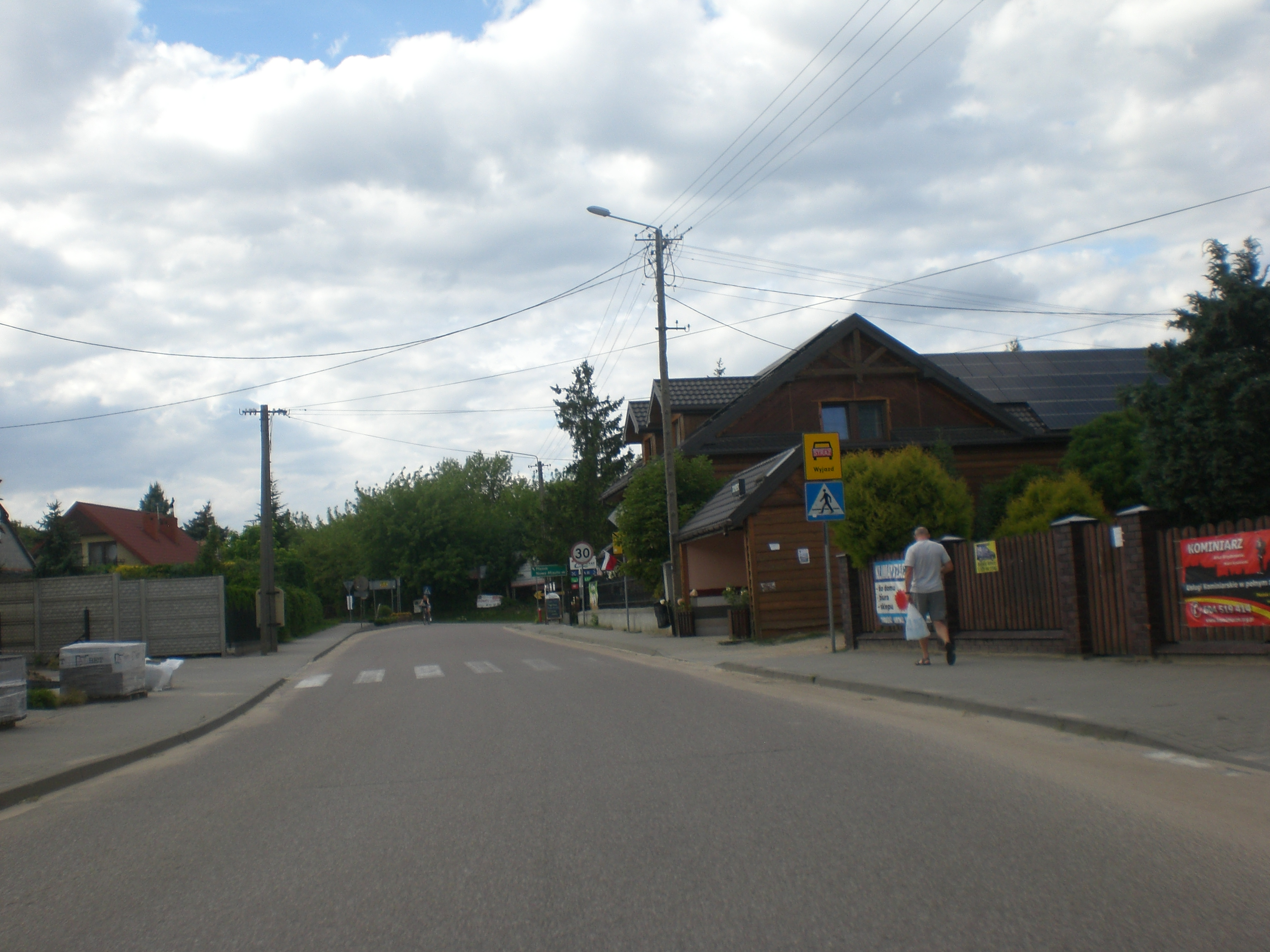
- Interactive map of Gmina Joniec
- Coordinates (Joniec): 52°36′N 20°35′E
- Country: Poland
- Voivodeship: Masovian
- County: Płońsk
- Seat: Joniec

Area
  - Total: 72.64 km^{2} (28.05 sq mi)

Population (2013)
  - Total: 2,614
  - Density: 35.99/km^{2} (93.20/sq mi)
- Website: ugjoniec.pl

Gmina Joniec is a rural gmina (administrative district) in Płońsk County, Masovian Voivodeship, in east-central Poland. Its seat is the village of Joniec, which lies approximately 14 kilometres (8.7 mi) east of Płońsk and 50 kilometres (31 mi) south-east of Warsaw.

The gmina covers an area of 72.64 square kilometres (28.0 sq mi), and as of 2006 its total population is 2,613 (2,614 in 2013).

== Villages ==
Gmina Joniec contains the villages and settlements of:

- Adamowo
- Joniec
- Joniec-Kolonia
- Józefowo
- Krajęczyn
- Królewo
- Ludwikowo
- Nowa Wrona
- Omięciny
- Osiek
- Popielżyn Górny
- Popielżyn-Zawady
- Proboszczewice
- Sobieski
- Soboklęszcz
- Stara Wrona
- Szumlin

== Neighbouring gminas ==
Gmina Joniec is bordered by the gminas of Nasielsk, Nowe Miasto, Płońsk, Sochocin, Zakroczym and Załuski.
