= Sadówiec =

- Village
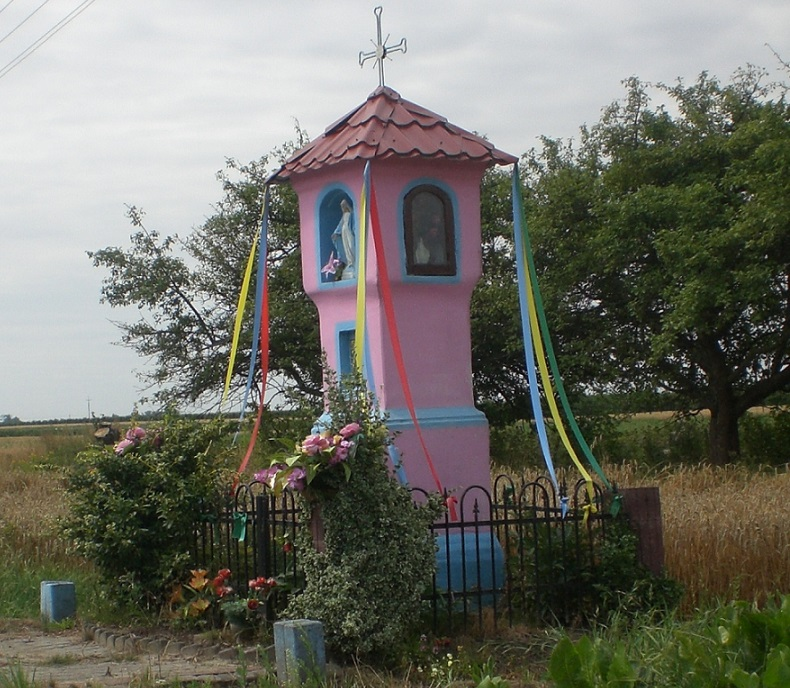

- Location within Poland
- Coordinates: 52°30′36″N 20°28′16″E
- Country: Poland
- Voivodeship: Masovian
- County: Płońsk
- Gmina: Załuski

Sadówiec [saˈduvjɛt͡s] is a village in the administrative district of Gmina Załuski, within Płońsk County, Masovian Voivodeship, in east-central Poland.
