= Szumlin =

- Village
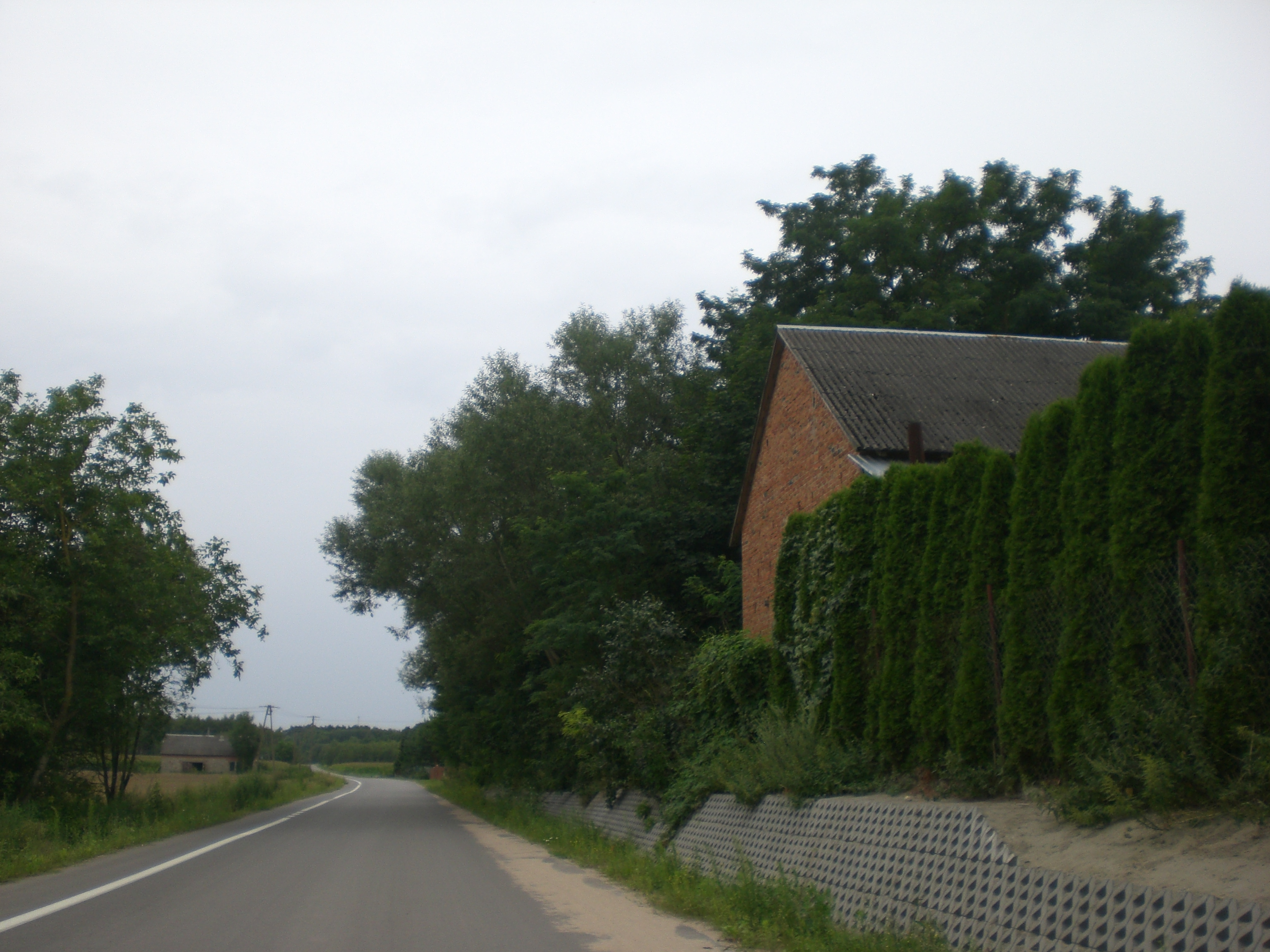

- Location within Poland
- Coordinates: 52°37′06″N 20°32′41″E
- Country: Poland
- Voivodeship: Masovian
- County: Płońsk
- Gmina: Joniec

Szumlin [ˈʂumlin] is a village in the administrative district of Gmina Joniec, within Płońsk County, Masovian Voivodeship, in east-central Poland.
