= Sobieski, Masovian Voivodeship =

Sobieski
- Village
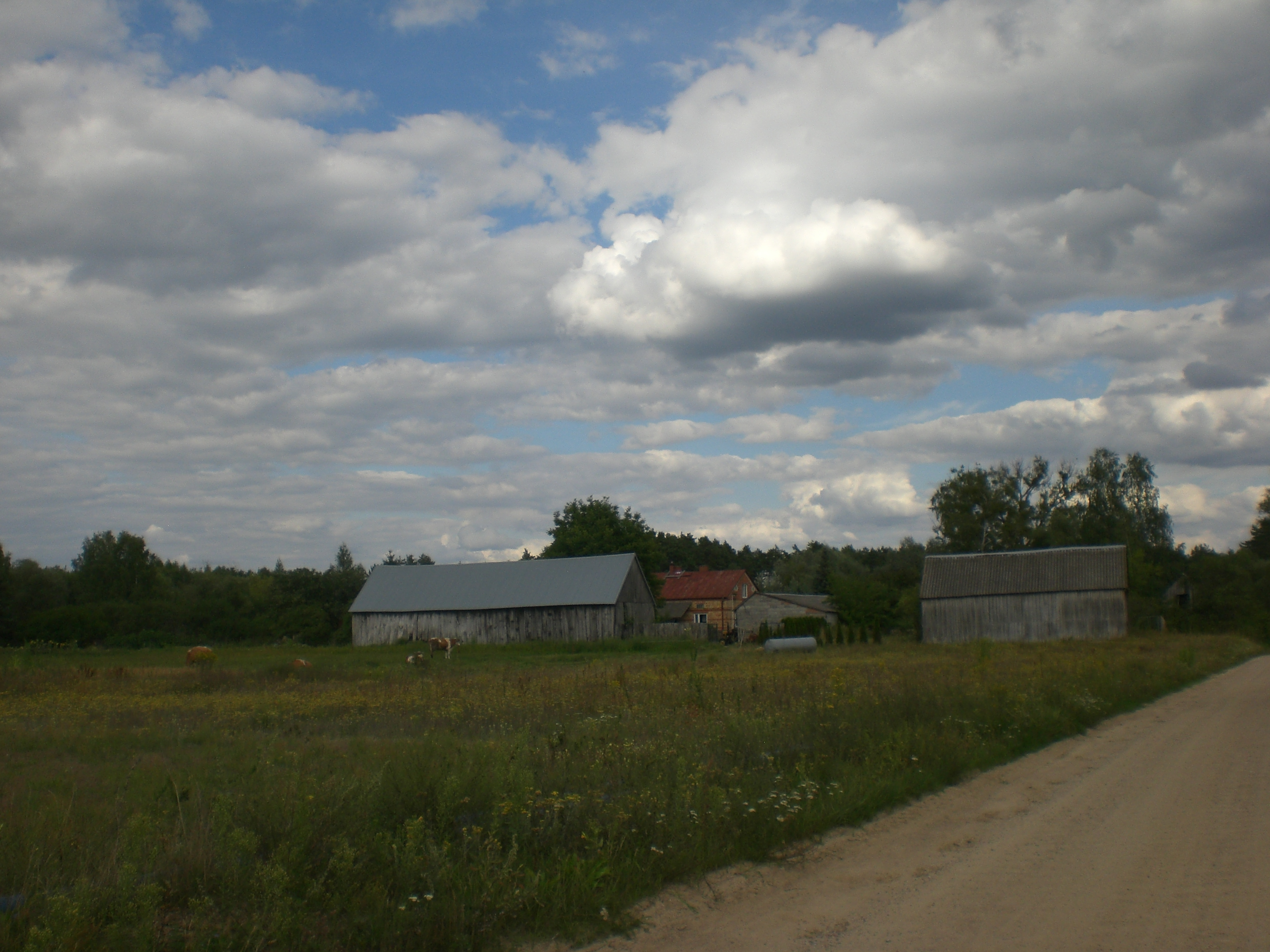

- Location within Poland
- Coordinates: 52°37′59″N 20°32′47″E
- Country: Poland
- Voivodeship: Masovian
- County: Płońsk
- Gmina: Joniec

Sobieski [sɔˈbjɛski] is a village in the administrative district of Gmina Joniec, within Płońsk County, Masovian Voivodeship, in east-central Poland.
