= Królewo, Masovian Voivodeship =

Królewo
- Village
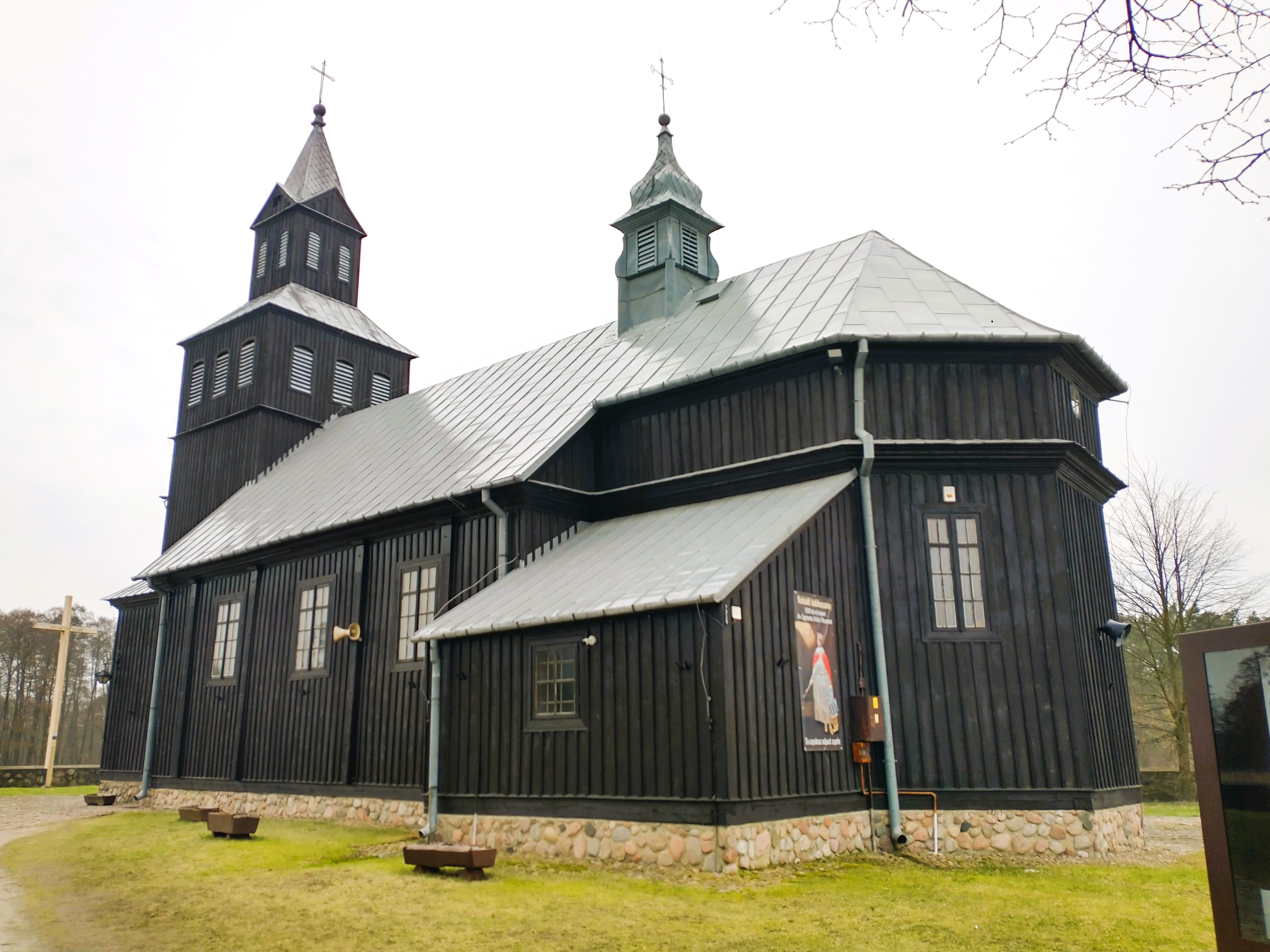
- Saint Sigismund church in Królewo in 2024

- Location within Poland
- Coordinates: 52°38′N 20°34′E
- Country: Poland
- Voivodeship: Masovian
- County: Płońsk
- Gmina: Joniec

Królewo [kruˈlɛvɔ] is a village in the administrative district of Gmina Joniec, within Płońsk County, Masovian Voivodeship, in east-central Poland.
