= Załuski, Płońsk County =

Załuski
- Village
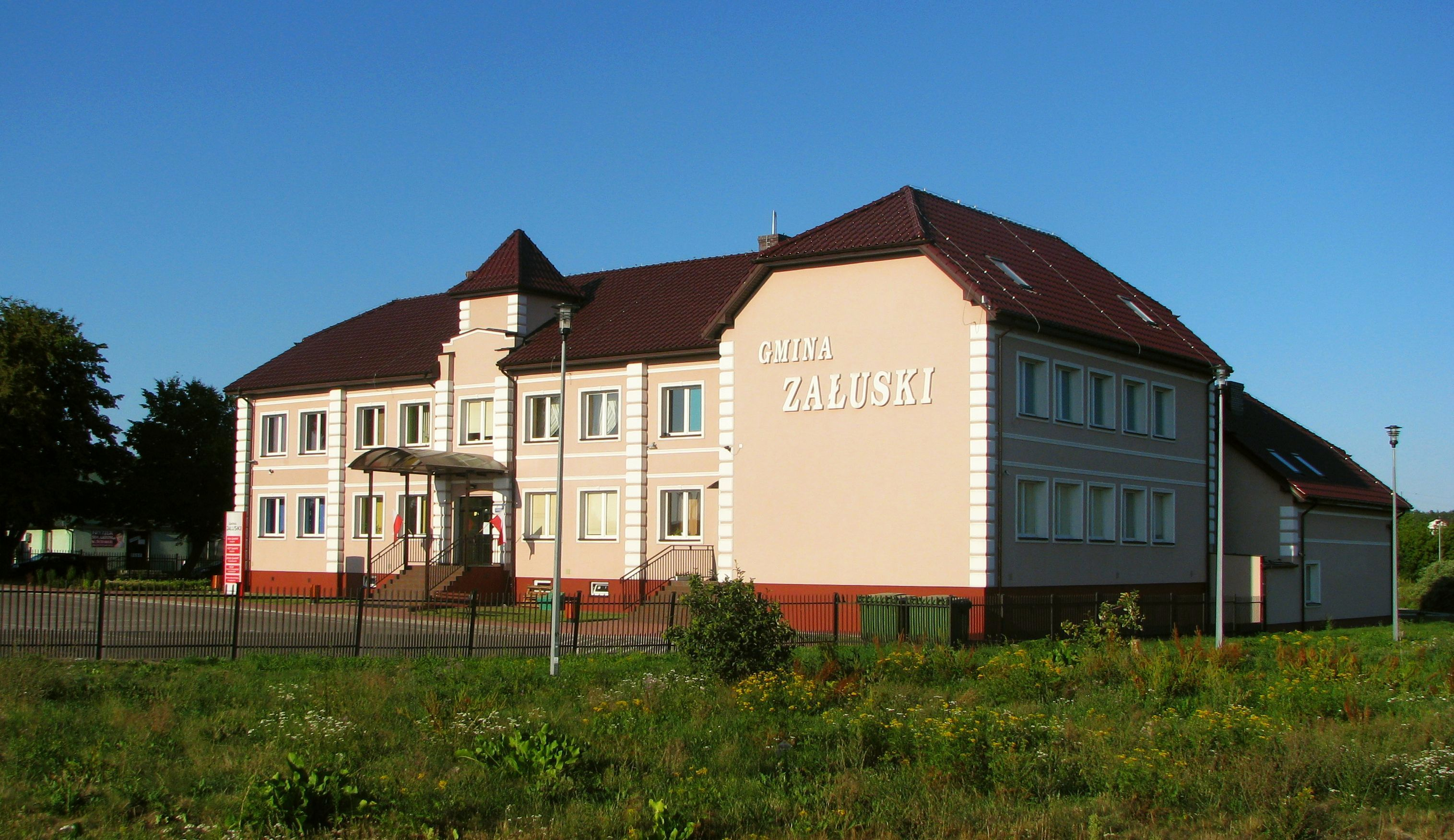
- Gmina Załuski administration building

- Location within Poland
- Coordinates: 52°30′N 20°31′E
- Country: Poland
- Voivodeship: Masovian
- County: Płońsk
- Gmina: Załuski
- Elevation: 125 m (410 ft)

Załuski [zaˈwuski] is a village in Płońsk County, Masovian Voivodeship, in east-central Poland. It is the seat of the gmina (administrative district) called Gmina Załuski.

== Transport ==
The S7 expressway bypasses Załuski to the west. Exit 54 of the S7 expressway allows for quick access to Gdańsk (289km to the north-west) and to Warsaw (50.5km to the south).

The nearest railway station to Załuski is in the town of Płońsk (17km to the north).
