= Płońsk County =

Płońsk County Powiat płoński
- County
- Flag Coat of arms

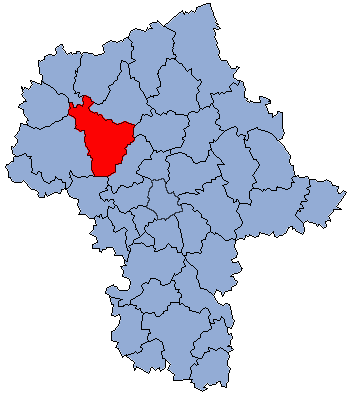
- Location within the voivodeship

- Division into gminas
- Coordinates (Płońsk): 52°38′N 20°23′E
- Country: Poland
- Voivodeship: Masovian
- Seat: Płońsk
- Gminas: Total 12 (incl. 2 urban): Płońsk; Raciąż; Gmina Baboszewo; Gmina Czerwińsk nad Wisłą; Gmina Dzierzążnia; Gmina Joniec; Gmina Naruszewo; Gmina Nowe Miasto; Gmina Płońsk; Gmina Raciąż; Gmina Sochocin; Gmina Załuski

Area
  - Total: 1,380 km^{2} (530 sq mi)

Population (2019)
  - Total: 87,183
  - Density: 63.2/km^{2} (164/sq mi)
- Car plates: WPN
- Website: www.powiat-plonski.pl

Płońsk County (Polish: powiat płoński) is a unit of territorial administration and local government (powiat) in Masovian Voivodeship in east-central Poland. It came into being on 1 January 1999, as a result of the Polish local government reforms passed in 1998. Its administrative seat and largest town is Płońsk, which lies 63 km (39 mi) north-west of Warsaw.

The county covers an area of 1,380 km^{2} (530 sq mi), and consists of two urban and ten rural gminas. It is bordered by eight other counties of the Masovian voivodeship. As of 2019, the county had a population of 87,183 inhabitants, of which about 26,514 reside in the two urban areas of Płońsk and Raciąż.

== Etymology ==
In the Middle Ages, the region was given by various names such as Plonz, Plonsko, Ploń, and Ploniska. There are two theories as to the origin of the name. As per the first theory, the name was derived from the Polish word "płona" or "płonia", meaning fast-flowing parts of a river. Another version states that the name came from the Slavic god Płon.

== History ==
Early archaeological evidence points to the region being inhabited at least since the 6th century CE. The St. Michael church and the former monastery of the Trzewiczkowe Carmelites, were founded in the early 15th century by the Mazovian prince, Siemowit IV and his wife Aleksandra, sister of king Władysław Jagiełło. Siemowit established Plonsk as a city in the region, which was later confirmed by king Sigismund I. The region underwent further economic development in the 16th century. However, in the 17th century, the population in the region declined as a result of the Swedish Deluge.

The region was occupied by the Russian Empire later. After the First World War, it became part of Poland, and Plonsk became the seat of the Plonsk district. The county is the birthplace of Ben Gurion, the founder of Israel. During the Second World War, the region was captured by Nazi Germany, and the region was segregated to separate the Jews from the ethnic Poles.

== Geography ==
Płońsk County is a powiat located in Masovian Voivodeship in east-central Poland. It came into being on 1 January 1999, as a result of the Polish local government reforms passed in 1998. Its administrative seat and largest town is Płońsk, which lies 63 km (39 mi) north-west of Warsaw. The county covers an area of 1,380 km^{2} (530 sq mi). It is bordered by Mława County and Ciechanów County to the north, Pułtusk County to the east, Nowy Dwór County to the south-east, Sochaczew County to the south, Płock County and Sierpc County to the west, and Żuromin County to the north-west. The Płonka river, which is the tributary of the Vistula river, passes through the region.

=== Administrative divisions ===
The county is subdivided into 12 gminas. These include the two urban areas of Płońsk and Raciąż and ten rural areas.

Gmina	Type	Area (km^{2})	Population (2019)	Seat
Płońsk	urban	11.6	22,130	Płońsk
Gmina Raciąż	rural	248.8	8,336	Raciąż (Note: Seat not part of the gmina)
Gmina Baboszewo	rural	162.4	7,957	Baboszewo
Gmina Płońsk	rural	127.3	7,922	Płońsk
Gmina Czerwińsk nad Wisłą	rural	146.1	7,657	Czerwińsk nad Wisłą
Gmina Naruszewo	rural	159.6	6,340	Naruszewo
Gmina Sochocin	rural	119.7	5,823	Sochocin
Gmina Załuski	rural	111.7	5,667	Załuski
Gmina Nowe Miasto	rural	118.4	4,659	Nowe Miasto
Raciąż	urban	3.8	4,384	Raciąż
Gmina Dzierzążnia	rural	102.1	3,658	Dzierzążnia
Gmina Joniec	rural	72.6	2,650	Joniec

== Demographics ==
As of 2019, the county had a population of 87,183 inhabitants, of which about 26,514 reside in the two urban areas of Płońsk and Raciąż. The county had a mixed ethnicity of ethnic Poles and Jews. Jewish settlements formed in the region in the 15th century. In the 17th century, during the reign of king Michael I, they were allowed special privileges to build houses and a synagogue. This resulted in a large influx of Jews into the county. In the early 19th century, the county was dominated by Jewish population and it had one of the largest percentage of Jewish population in the country. In the subsequent years, the Jewish population reduced due to emigration.
