= Dowbór-Muśnicki =

Dowbor-Muśnicki, feminine: Dowbor-Muśnicka is a Polish surname. Notable people with the surname include:

- Agnieszka Dowbor-Muśnicka, Polish resistance member
- Janina Dowbor-Muśnicka, birth name of Janina Lewandowska (1908–1940), Polish aviator
- Józef Dowbor-Muśnicki (1867–1937), Polish military officer
- Konstanty Dowbor-Muśnicki (1857–1931) general in the Russian Imperial Army and in Polish Army
- Rafał Dowbor-Muśnicki (fl. 1744–1783), Polish nobleman and statesman
