= PBG =

PBG is a three-letter abbreviation which may represent:

- Palm Beach Gardens, Florida, a US city
- Parallel Blade with Ground, a term used in theater lighting to designate an ordinary NEMA 5-15 electrical power connector
- The Pepsi Bottling Group (NYSE:PBG), a US company
- Porphobilinogen
- Plattsburgh International Airport in Plattsburgh, New York (IATA Code: PBG)
- Photonic band gap, a property of Photonic crystals
- Paintball gun (marker)
- President's Bodyguard, a regiment of the Indian Army
- Pole of Good Government, a former political alliance in Italy
- PBG SA, a Polish engineering firm
- Bank PBG, a former Polish bank
- Private Burial Ground, used often on Certificates of Death in the first half of the 20th Century
