= Stadion Narodowy =

Sports venue in Warsaw, Poland

- Stadion Narodowy im. Kazimierza Górskiego

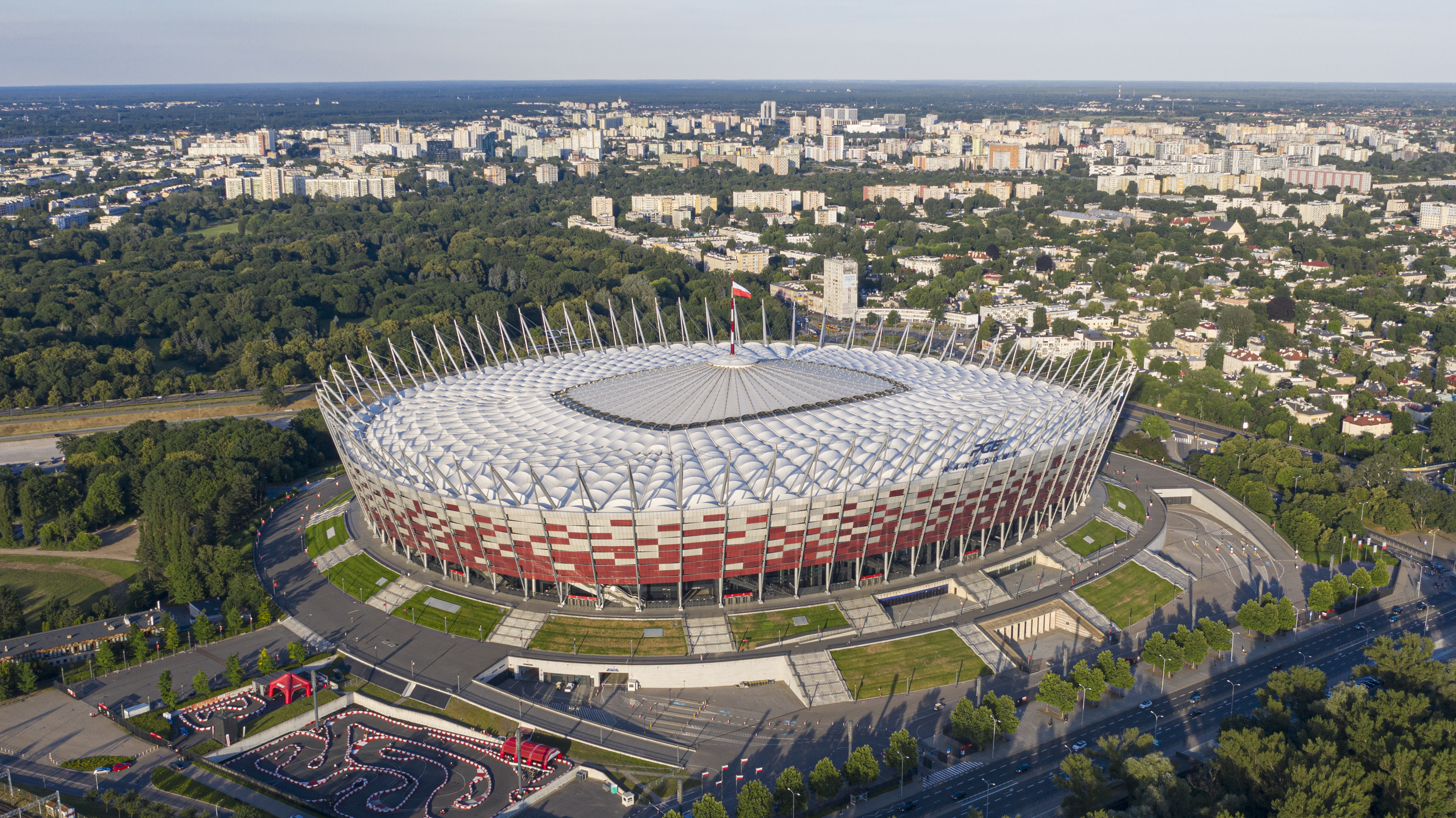
- UEFA
- Interactive map of Stadion Narodowy
- Full name: PGE Narodowy im. Kazimierza Górskiego
- Location: al. Zieleniecka 1, Warsaw, Poland
- Coordinates: 52°14′22″N 21°02′44″E
- Owner: State Treasury
- Operator: PL.2012+
- Capacity: over 58,000 (official seating capacity); 56,826 (UEFA capacity) over 80,000 (official concert capacity)
- Executive suites: 69
- Roof: Retractable
- Surface: Grass
- Record attendance: 61,500 (sport event); 2014 FIVB Volleyball Men's World Championship; Poland 3–0 Serbia, August 30, 2014
- Field size: 105 m × 68 m (344 ft × 223 ft)
- Public transit: Stadion Narodowy; Warszawa Stadion

Construction
- Groundbreaking: 2008
- Built: 2008–2011
- Opened: 29 January 2012
- Cost: c. 1.91 billion zl (€ ≈0.43 billion)
- Architects: JSK Architekci [leader], gmp - Architects von Gerkan, Marg and Partners, sbp
- Project managers: Markus Pfisterer; Martin Hakiel; Martin Glass; Mariusz Rutz; Zbigniew Pszczulny; Marcin Chruslinski
- Structural engineer: Schlaich Bergermann & Partner

Tenant
- Poland national football team

Website
- pgenarodowy.pl

The Stadion Narodowy (Polish pronunciation: [ˈstadʲjɔn narɔˈdɔvɨ], English: National Stadium), known for sponsorship reasons as the PGE Narodowy since 2015 (with patron Kazimierz Górski being added in 2021), is a retractable roof football stadium located in Warsaw, Poland. It is used mostly for concerts and football matches and is the home stadium of the Poland national team.

With a seating capacity of 58,580, the stadium is the largest association football arena in Poland. Its construction was started in 2008 and finished in November 2011. It is located on the site of the former 10th-Anniversary Stadium, at the Zieleniecka Avenue in Praga Południe district, near the city centre. The stadium has a retractable PVC roof which unfolds from a nest on a spire suspended above the centre of the pitch. The retractable roof is inspired by the cable-supported unfolding system of Commerzbank-Arena in Frankfurt, Germany, and is similar to the roof of BC Place in Vancouver, British Columbia, Canada. The stadium is also very similar to the Arena Națională in Bucharest in terms of age, capacity and the roof.

The National Stadium hosted the opening match (a group match), two additional group matches, a quarter-final, and a semi-final of UEFA Euro 2012, which was co-hosted by Poland and Ukraine.

The stadium is equipped with a heated pitch, training pitch, façade lighting, and underground parking. It is a multipurpose venue that is able to host sporting events, concerts, cultural events, and conferences. The official stadium opening took place on 19 January 2012, and the first football match was played on 29 February 2012. The match between the Poland national football team and the Portugal national football team ended in a 0–0 draw.

The stadium hosted the 2014–15 UEFA Europa League final and the 2024 UEFA Super Cup.

On 11 November 2022, the stadium roof was ordered closed with immediate effect due to construction issues.

== Stadium specifics ==
=== Construction and architecture ===
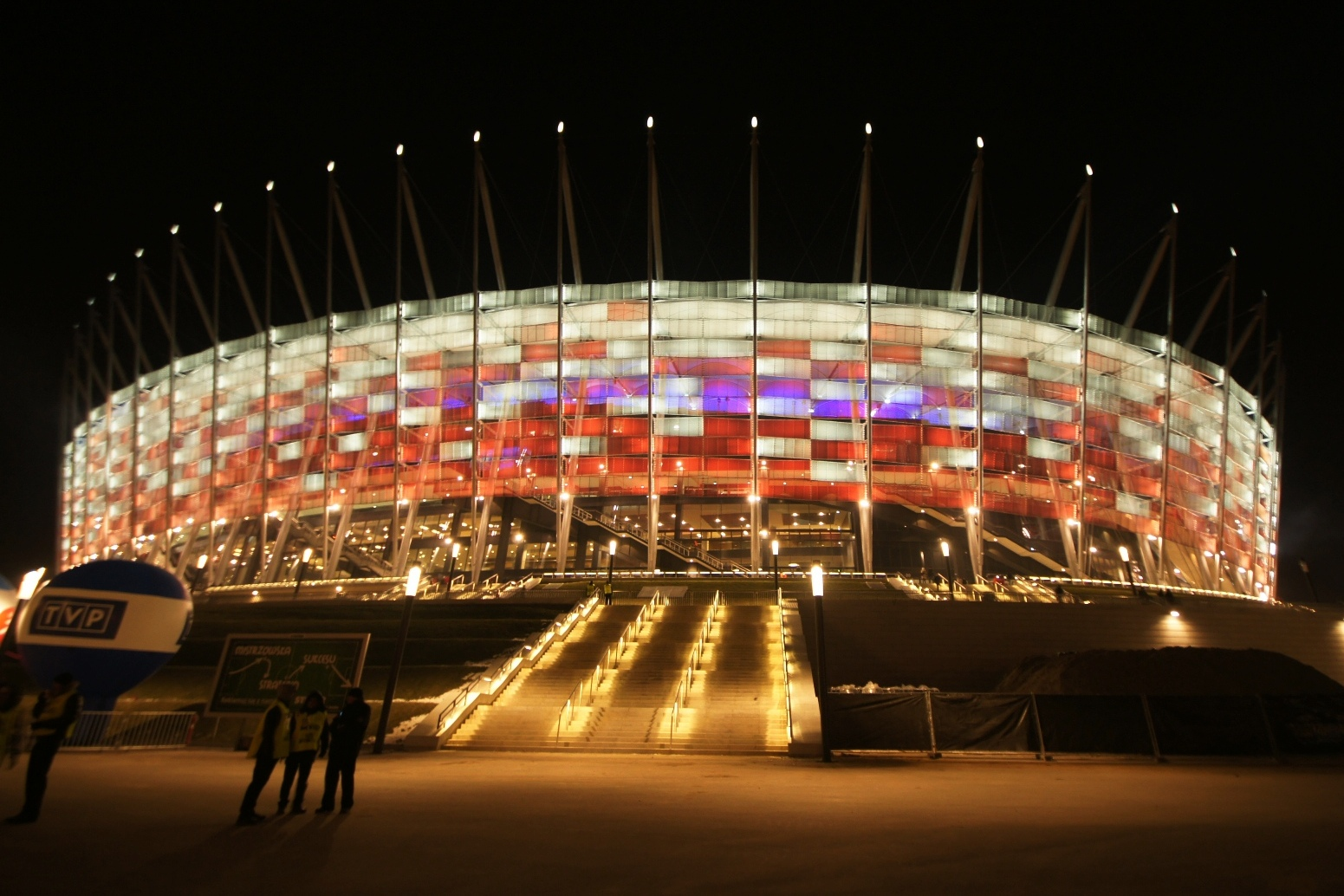
Night illumination of the stadium façade after opening match between Poland and Portugal on 29 February 2012

The general contractor of the National Stadium was a German-Austrian-Polish consortium led by Alpine Bau and made up of Alpine Bau Deutschland, Alpine Construction Poland, PBG SA and Hydrobudowa Poland SA. The completion date was set for 24 months from the signing of the contract and the construction process involved approximately 1,200 employees.

The stadium has a capacity of 58,580 seats for spectators during football matches and up to 72,900 during concerts and other events (including 106 sites for disabled people). The total volume of the stadium (without the roof) is more than 1,000,000 cubic metres (35,000,000 cu ft) and the total area is 204,000 square metres (2,200,000 sq ft). The retractable roof structure is 240 by 270 metres (790 ft × 890 ft) and the central spire stands at a height of 124 metres (407 ft) above the River Vistula and 100 metres (330 ft) above the pitch. The total length of the lower promenade is 924 metres (3,031 ft). The stadium has the largest conference center in Warsaw with a capacity of 1600 people including 25,000 square metres (270,000 sq ft) of commercial office space. Underground parking for 1765 cars is located beneath the pitch. The stadium contains restaurants, a fitness club, a pub, and 69 luxury skyboxes.

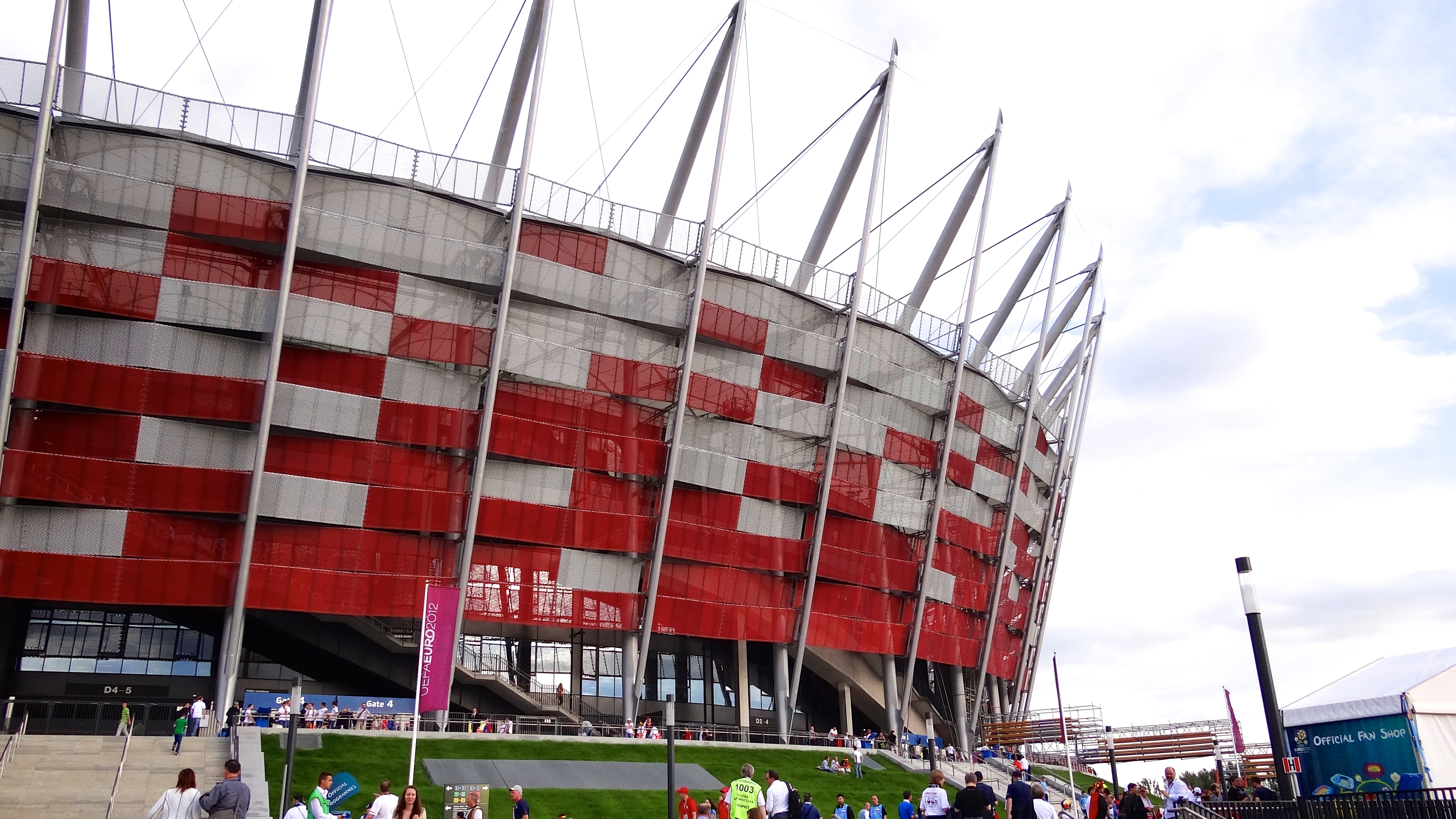
The crown of National Stadium with red and white façade resembling Polish national colors

The National Stadium is a multi-sports facility that allows for the organization of sporting events, concerts and cultural events. In addition, it will also serve as an office, market place, hotel, gastronomic point and have other uses. As a result, it is expected that about 2000 to 3000 people will visit the stadium every single day.

=== Facade ===
The stadium's façade refers to the Polish national colors, resembling a waving flag of Poland and it consists of silver and red colors. The same palette was used to color the stadium's seating. The facade which consists of painted mesh that was imported from Spain, covers the inner aluminum and glass elevation. The stadium is an open structure, which means the lack of a closed facade, so the temperature inside is similar to the environmental temperature, despite the closed roof construction. Such a construction allows for natural ventilation of rooms placed under the stands and access to natural light.

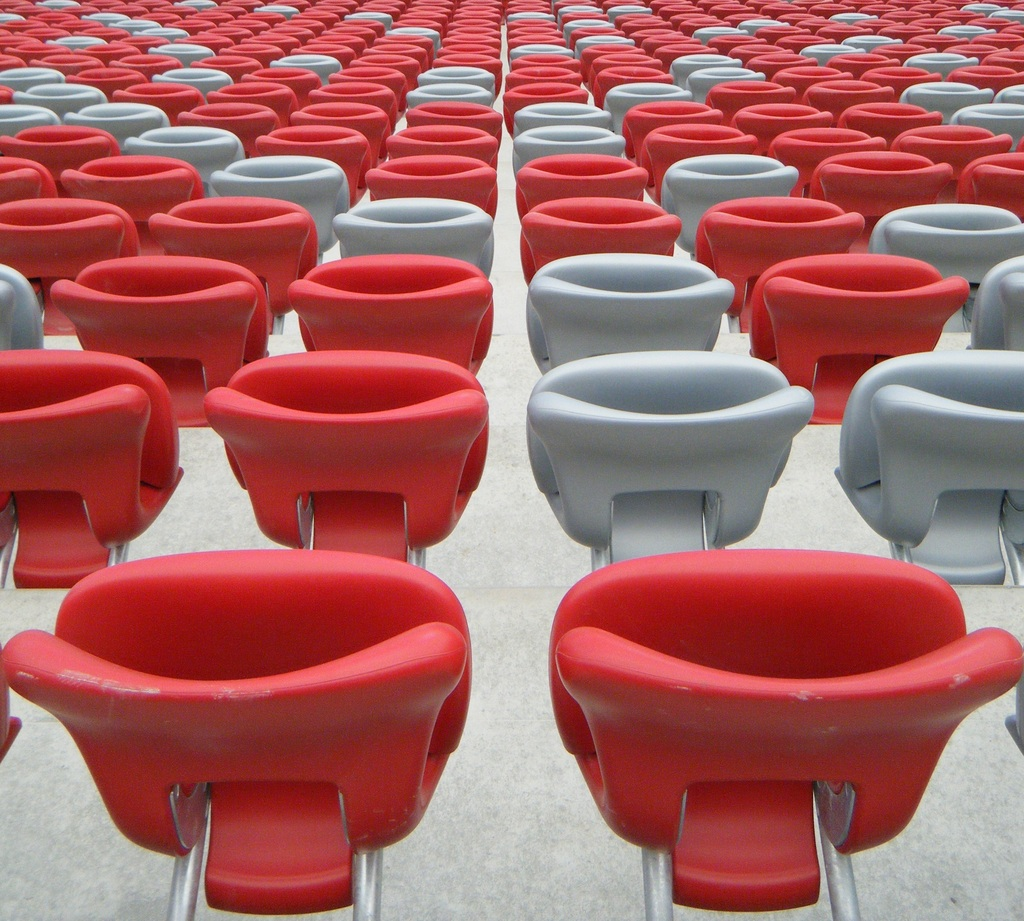
Tip-up standard stadium seats, type: FCB in red and silver colors

Elevations are stretched on pipes that were manufactured in Italy. This structure is completely independent from the concrete stand construction, and it is fundamental to the retractable stadium's roof. Thanks to this, designers could freely design the space under the stands.

=== The pitch ===
The stadium is equipped with a heated pitch. The pitch is installed with a lawn of Dutch grass, cultivated in Heythuysen, the Netherlands. During the organization of events such as concerts, the pitch will be covered with special panel, which must be removed within 5 days of its installation. A second option: to install a grass field on a special floating platform, was discarded due to it being too expensive.

=== The grandstands ===
The National Stadium was designed by the German-Polish consortium gmp Architects von Gerkan, Marg and Partners, J.S.K Architekci Sp. z o.o. and sbp—schlaich bergermann und partner (the design by Volkwin Marg and Hubert Nienhoff with Markus Pfisterer, Zbigniew Pszczulny, Mariusz Rutz, Marcin Chruslinski).

The structure is composed of two-level stands—top and bottom—with a capacity for 58,580 spectators. All seating in the National Stadium was provided by Polish company Forum Seating (part of the Nowy Styl Group located in Krosno). There are 900 seats for media and press, more than 4,600 so-called "premium seats", designed for special guests, 106 seats for disabled people and more than 800 seats in the VIP lodges.

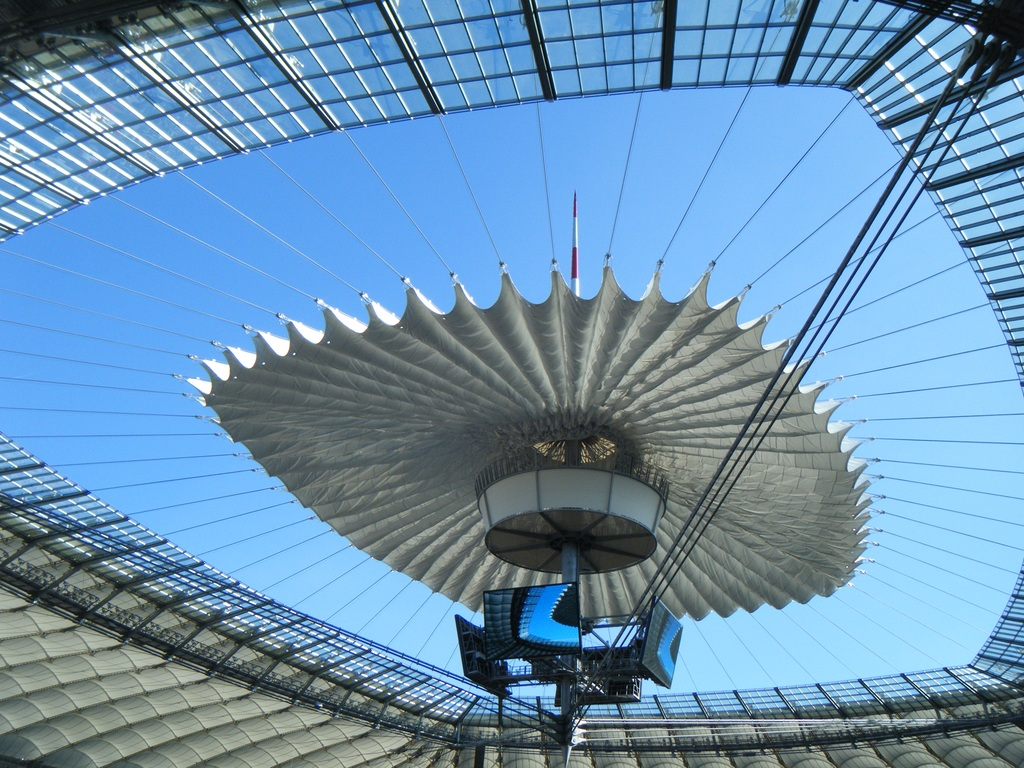
The unique retractable roof membrane during the process of opening

Under the stands, there are changing rooms, conference halls and living areas with a total area of 130,000 m^{2} (1,400,000 sq ft). The building has eight stories with varied heights. The highest point at the stands, is located 41 metres (135 ft) above the former 10th-Anniversary Stadium pitch, while the highest point of the steel roof structure is 70 metres (230 ft) above that level. The roof can cover not only the stands, but also the pitch.

=== Retractable roof ===
Partially transparent, the retractable roof was made of fibreglass covered with teflon. This kind of material is resistant to weather factors (rain, the heat of the sun, and can hold up to 18 cm (7.1 in) of wet snow) and the crease tendency. The production technology comes from German company Hightex GmbH, and the textile was produced in Bangkok by the Asia Membrane Co. Ltd.

The process of opening or closing the roof takes about 20 minutes and it can only be performed at temperatures above 5 °C (41 °F) and not during rain (this was the reason for a one-day postponement of the football match against England on 16 October 2012). A drive system is used for stretching the membrane during the process of opening and for folding the material during the process of closing the roof. The total weight of the steel-cables supporting the roof structure is 1,200 metric tons (2,600,000 lb). Under the roof, there are four LED display screens, each with an area of 200 m^{2} (2,200 sq ft).

== Construction history ==
=== Preparations ===
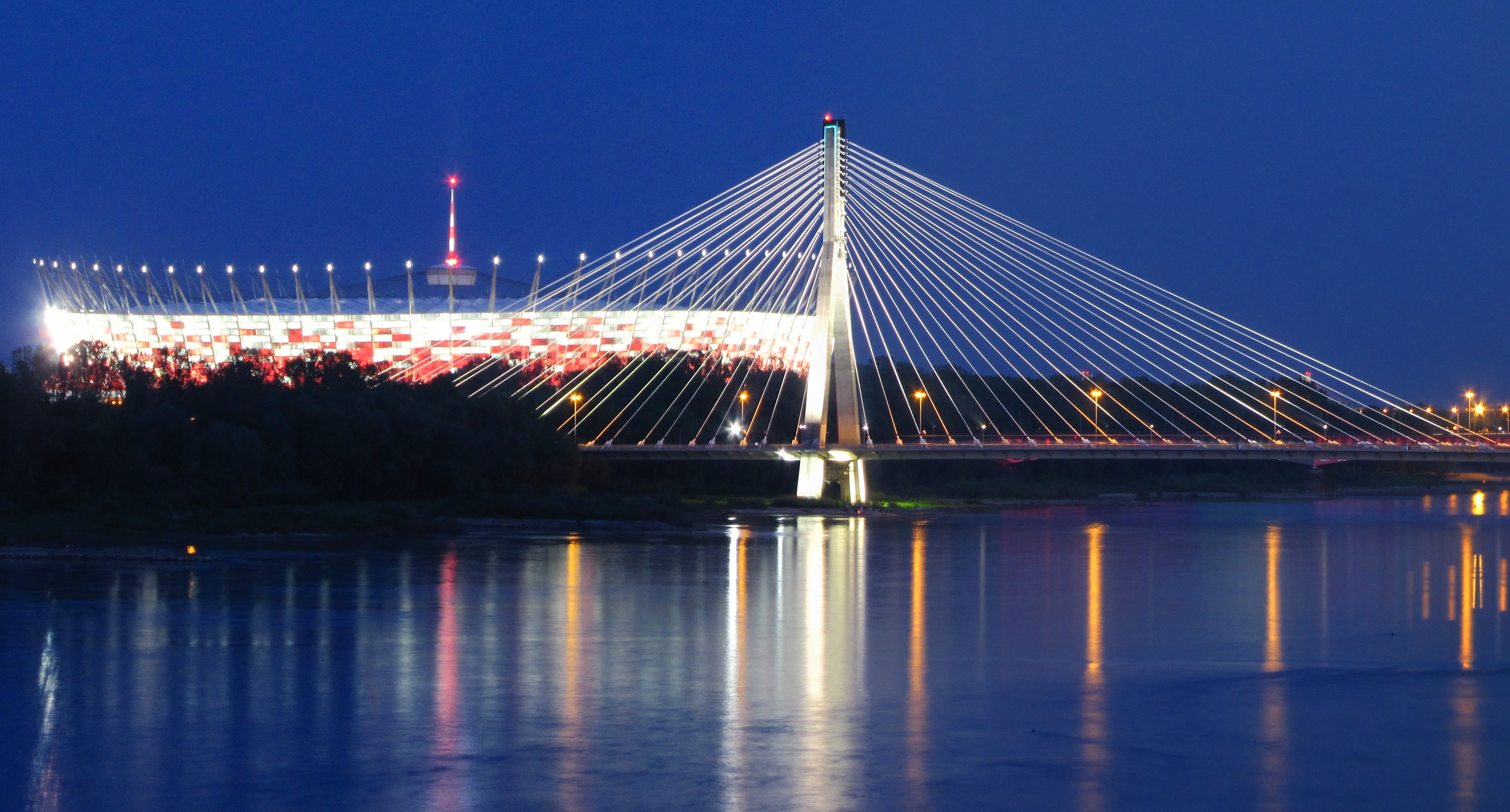
Night view of the National Stadium and the Świętokrzyski Bridge from the left bank of the Vistula

On 1 February 2008, the consortium of JSK Architects Ltd., GMP—von Gerkan, Marg und Partner Architekten and SBP—Schleich Bergermann und Partner presented a conceptual design (visualization and scale model) of a new stadium.

The first pre-construction work began on 15 May 2008 when 126 concrete piles were driven into the soil of the basin of the old stadium's grandstand. On 18 June 2008, the National Sports Centre Ltd submitted documents required to obtain a construction permit from the governor of Masovia. This was approved on 22 July 2008, and on 26 September 2008, an agreement with Pol-Aqua SA to implement the first stage of construction work was signed. A few days later, on 7 October 2008, the construction of the stadium began.

On the construction site, close to the National Sports Centre, an outdoor webcam was installed. Broadcasting started on 31 October 2008 and people could track the progress of construction. Since the start of the second stage of construction on 29 June 2009, the entire process was also viewable from a second camera installed on a tower at Washington Roundabout. Images from the cameras are still available on the official websites of the stadium.

=== Main process ===
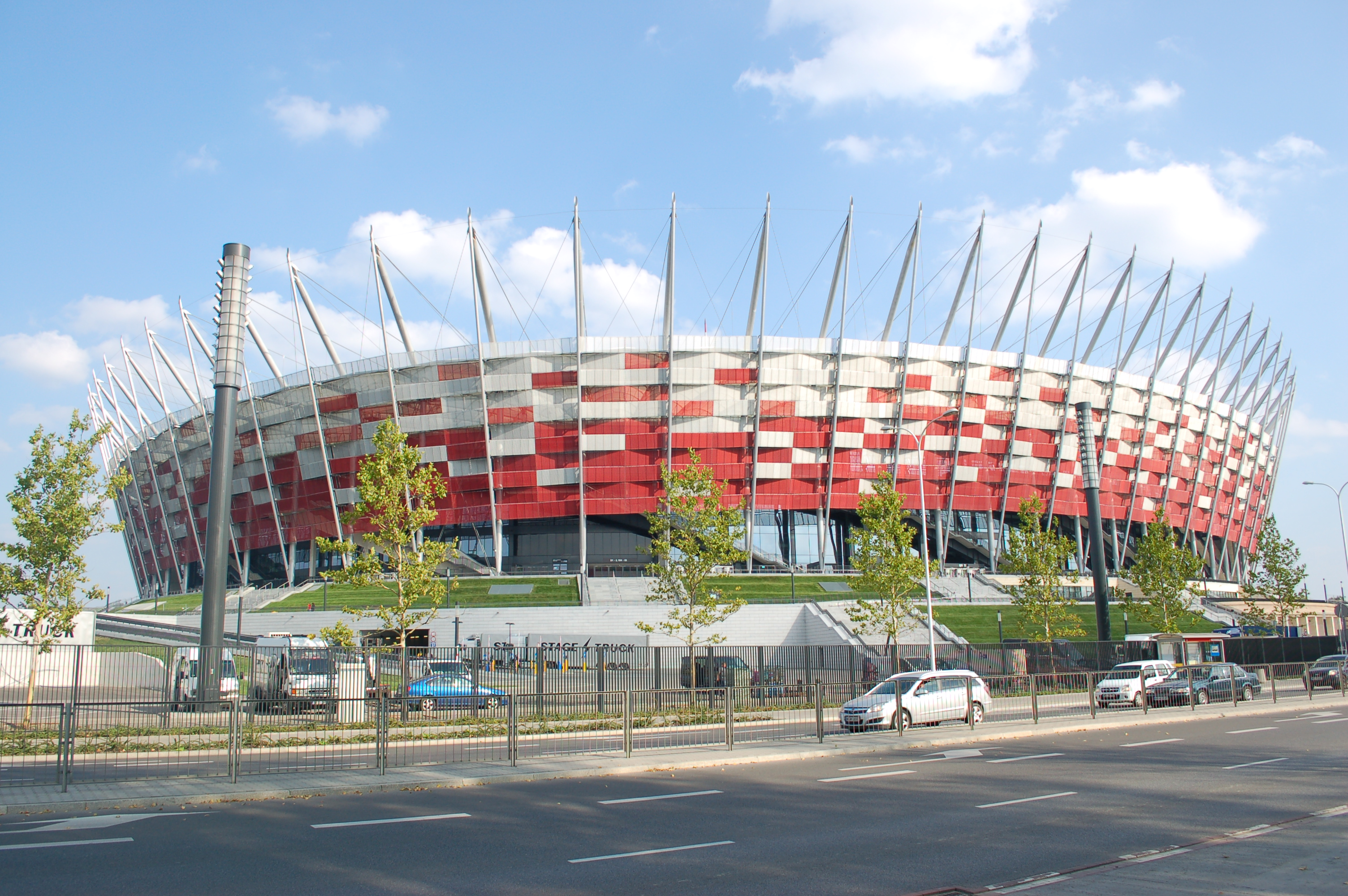
National Stadium as it is seen from aleja Józefa Poniatowskiego in September 2012

The first stage of construction included the demolition of concrete structures of the 10th-Anniversary Stadium, preparation of the ground, driving about 7000 concrete piles into the soil, construction of 6700 gravel and concrete columns, and the building of approximately 900 construction piles that now form the foundation of the stadium.

On 9 March 2009, the pile driving process was completed, and exactly one month later, opening of the offers from companies wishing to implement the second stage of the stadium construction took place. The best offer was introduced by German-Austrian-Polish consortium of companies - Alpine Bau Deutschland AG, Alpine Bau GmbH and Alpine Construction Poland Ltd., Hydrobudowa Poland SA and PBG SA and it was worth zl 1,252,755,008.64.

At the end of September, the first construction elements were visible from outside the stadium. The cornerstone (foundation stone) and a time capsule were set during the ceremony held on 7 October 2009. The time capsule contained flags of Poland, the European Union and the city of Warsaw, newspapers of the day, coins, banknotes, and other artifacts.

At the end of January, the first element of the roof structure arrived at the construction site. This element was 1 of 72 that became part of the massive steel roof structure. Each of them weighs about 48 metric tons (106,000 lb) and is 12.5 metres (41 ft) tall. The completion of installation of all prefabricated elements took place by 13 August 2010, which represented the entire structure of the stadium stands. Ten days later all concrete works were finished.

On 16 December 2010 at the headquarters of the National Sports Centre, a press conference took place dedicated to the so-called 'big lift operation' at the stadium. The conference discussed the main principles of the process, one of the most technologically advanced operations in the world and the first such project in Europe. No major problems occurred during this operation and 'big lift' was finalized on 4 January 2011. On this occasion, in the presence of Prime Minister Donald Tusk and Mayor of Warsaw Hanna Gronkiewicz-Waltz, a ceremony of symbolic topping-out was held.

=== Completion and opening ===
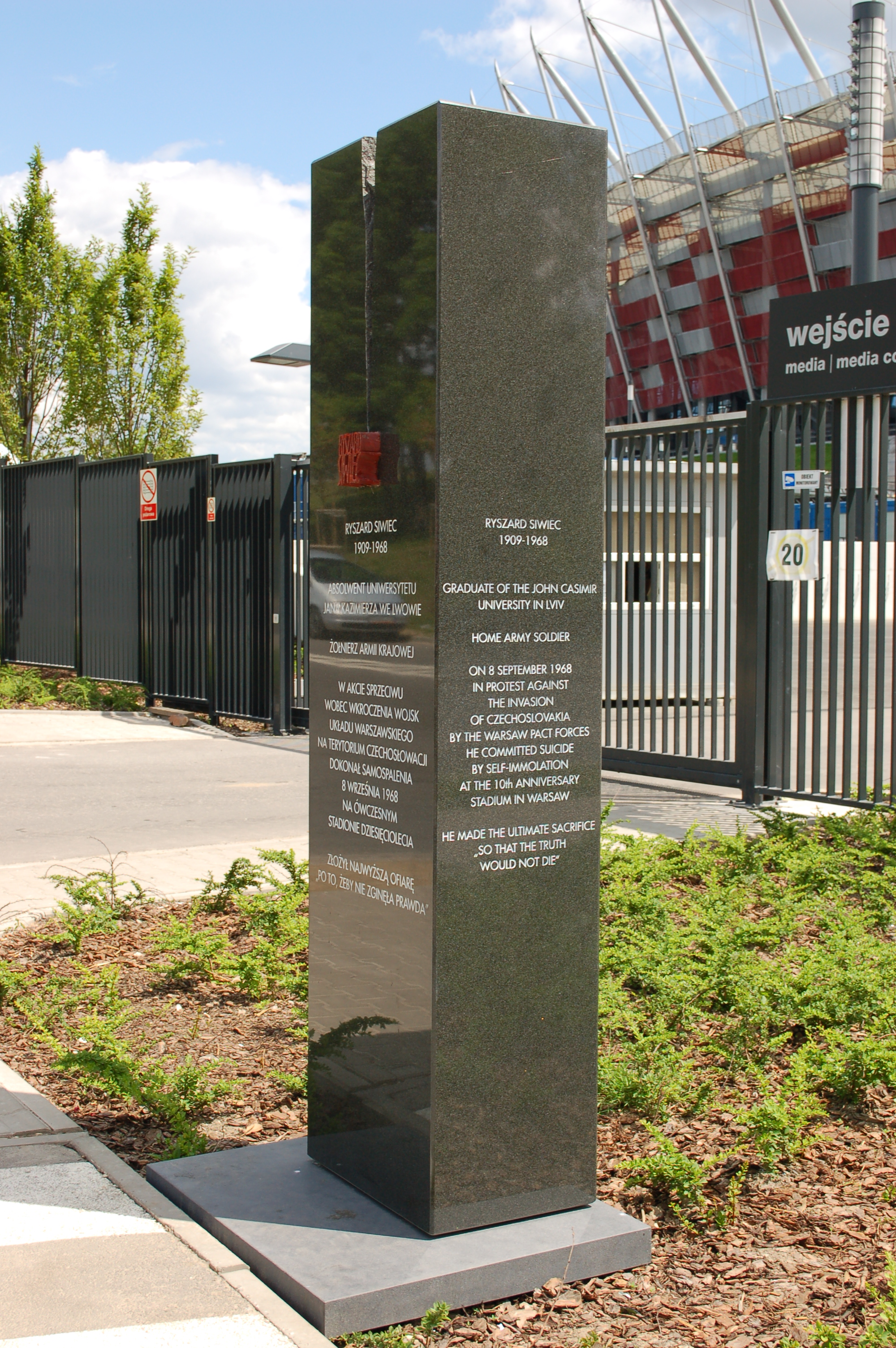
Obelisk in memory of Ryszard Siwiec, on the street named for him next to the National Stadium

The National Stadium was originally planned to be completed on 30 June 2011. The stadium was scheduled to be opened to the public on 22 July 2011, while its official opening was scheduled to take place on 27 August. Due to ongoing construction, the event was moved to January 2012 and only an inaugural illumination of the facade of the stadium took place in August. A match against the Germany national football team had been scheduled on 6 September 2011 but this was relocated to Gdańsk, because the National Stadium wasn't ready yet.

Construction work was officially completed on 29 November 2011. One day later, Rafał Kapler, the NCS president, submitted to the site manager an application needed to get a certificate of occupancy. The official opening ceremony of the stadium took place on 29 January 2012. The event was celebrated by concerts by Polish celebrities: Voo Voo and Haydamaky, Zakopower, Coma, T. Love, Lady Pank and ended with an evening fireworks show. On 10 February 2012, installation of heating and irrigation systems and the pitch installation was completed.

Prior to the opening of the stadium, the new street on its northern side was named for Ryszard Siwiec, who committed suicide by self-immolation in protest against the Warsaw Pact invasion of Czechoslovakia at the 10th-Anniversary Stadium in 1968.

== Transport ==
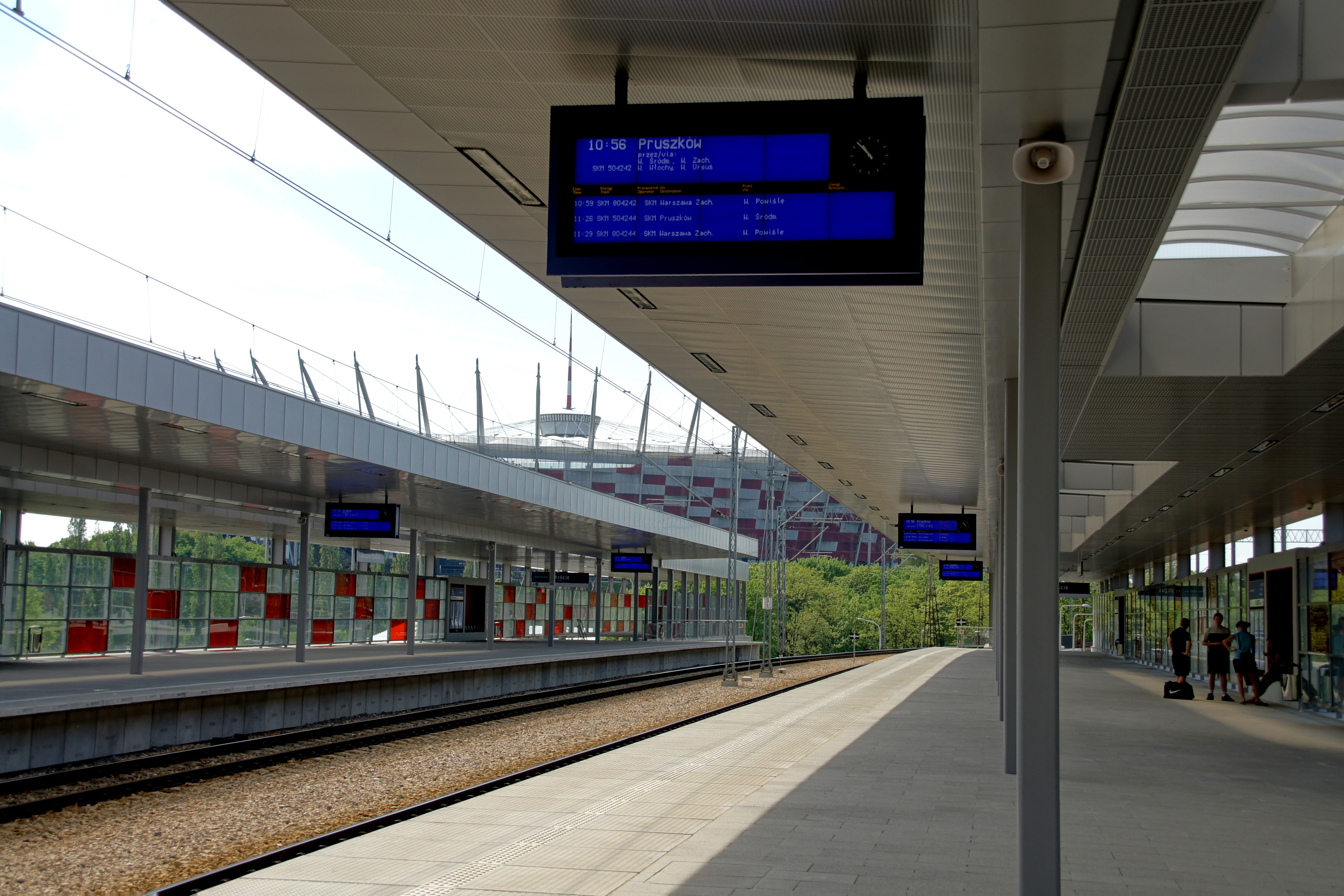
Warszawa Stadion railway station; the stadium itself can be seen in the background

=== Railways and metro ===
The stadium is located near the railway station Warszawa Stadion. The station has two side platforms flanking the suburban tracks of the Warsaw Cross-City Line used by the regional trains run by Masovian Railways and Rapid Urban Railway (Warsaw). The stadium can be reached by the S1 and S2 lines. The trip from central Warsaw takes about 5 minutes, and during the rush hours trains run every 4 minutes. Within an hour about 26000 people could reach stadium only by trains. In early 2012, the station has undergone thorough modernization in preparation for the new stadium and for the UEFA Euro 2012.

The stadium is accessible from the Warsaw Metro. The closest station is Stadion Narodowy metro station (C14) opened in March 2015.

=== Buses and trams ===
Around the stadium there are several tram and bus stops. The most convenient way to reach the stadium from the city centre is to use the transport hub located at the George Washington Roundabout (Rondo Jerzego Waszyngtona).

== Events ==
=== Poland national football team matches ===
On 29 February 2012, 100 days before the start of UEFA Euro 2012 tournament, the Poland national football team, played the inaugural match against the Portugal national team which ended with a goalless draw.

Nr	Competition	Date	Opponent	Result	Attendance	Scorers for Poland
1	Friendly	29 February 2012	Portugal	0–0	53,179	–––
2	UEFA Euro 2012	8 June 2012	Greece	1–1	56,070	Robert Lewandowski
3	UEFA Euro 2012	12 June 2012	Russia	1–1	55,920	Jakub Błaszczykowski
4	Friendly	12 October 2012	South Africa	1–0	42,026	Marcin Komorowski
5	2014 FIFA World Cup qualification	17 October 2012	England	1–1	47,300	Kamil Glik
6	2014 FIFA World Cup qualification	22 March 2013	Ukraine	1–3	55,565	Łukasz Piszczek
7	2014 FIFA World Cup qualification	26 March 2013	San Marino	5–0	43,008	2 x Robert Lewandowski, Łukasz Piszczek, Łukasz Teodorczyk, Jakub Kosecki
8	2014 FIFA World Cup qualification	6 September 2013	Montenegro	1–1	45,652	Robert Lewandowski
9	Friendly	5 March 2014	Scotland	0–1	41,652	–––
10	UEFA Euro 2016 qualification	11 October 2014	Germany	2–0	56,934	Arkadiusz Milik, Sebastian Mila
11	UEFA Euro 2016 qualification	14 October 2014	Scotland	2–2	55,197	Krzysztof Mączyński, Arkadiusz Milik
12	UEFA Euro 2016 qualification	13 June 2015	Georgia	4–0	56,512	3 x Robert Lewandowski, Arkadiusz Milik
13	UEFA Euro 2016 qualification	7 September 2015	Gibraltar	8–1	27,763	2 x Kamil Grosicki, 2 x Robert Lewandowski, 2 x Arkadiusz Milik, Jakub Błaszczykowski, Bartosz Kapustka
14	UEFA Euro 2016 qualification	11 October 2015	Republic of Ireland	2–1	57,497	Grzegorz Krychowiak, Robert Lewandowski
15	Friendly	13 November 2015	Iceland	4–2	56,207	2 x Robert Lewandowski, Kamil Grosicki, Bartosz Kapustka
16	2018 FIFA World Cup qualification	8 October 2016	Denmark	3–2	56,811	3 x Robert Lewandowski
17	2018 FIFA World Cup qualification	11 October 2016	Armenia	2–1	44,786	Hrayr Mkoyan (o.g.), Robert Lewandowski
18	2018 FIFA World Cup qualification	10 June 2017	Romania	3–1	57,128	3 x Robert Lewandowski
19	2018 FIFA World Cup qualification	4 September 2017	Kazakhstan	3–0	56,963	Arkadiusz Milik, Kamil Glik, Robert Lewandowski
20	2018 FIFA World Cup qualification	8 October 2017	Montenegro	4–2	57,538	Krzysztof Mączyński, Kamil Grosicki, Robert Lewandowski, Filip Stojković (o.g.)
21	Friendly	10 November 2017	Uruguay	0–0	56,147	–––
22	Friendly	12 June 2018	Lithuania	4–0	57,211	2 x Robert Lewandowski, Dawid Kownacki, Jakub Błaszczykowski
23	UEFA Euro 2020 qualification	24 March 2019	Latvia	2–0	51,112	Robert Lewandowski, Kamil Glik
24	UEFA Euro 2020 qualification	10 June 2019	Israel	4–0	57,229	Krzysztof Piątek, Robert Lewandowski, Kamil Grosicki, Damian Kądzior
25	UEFA Euro 2020 qualification	9 September 2019	Austria	0–0	56,788	–––
26	UEFA Euro 2020 qualification	13 October 2019	North Macedonia	2–0	52,894	Przemysław Frankowski, Arkadiusz Milik
27	UEFA Euro 2020 qualification	19 November 2019	Slovenia	3–2	53,946	Sebastian Szymański, Robert Lewandowski, Jacek Góralski
28	2022 FIFA World Cup qualification	2 September 2021	Albania	4–1	38,254	Robert Lewandowski, Adam Buksa, Grzegorz Krychowiak, Karol Linetty
29	2022 FIFA World Cup qualification	8 September 2021	England	1–1	56,212	Damian Szymański
30	2022 FIFA World Cup qualification	9 October 2021	San Marino	5–0	56,128	Karol Świderski, Cristian Brolli (o.g.), Tomasz Kędziora, Adam Buksa, Krzysztof Piątek
31	2022 FIFA World Cup qualification	15 November 2021	Hungary	1–2	56,197	Karol Świderski
32	2022–23 UEFA Nations League	14 June 2022	Belgium	0–1	56,803	–––
33	2022–23 UEFA Nations League	22 September 2022	Netherlands	0–2	56,673	–––
34	UEFA Euro 2024 qualification	27 March 2023	Albania	1–0	56,227	Karol Świderski
35	Friendly	16 June 2023	Germany	1–0	57,098	Jakub Kiwior
36	UEFA Euro 2024 qualification	7 September 2023	Faroe Islands	2–0	54,129	2 x Robert Lewandowski
37	UEFA Euro 2024 qualification	15 October 2023	Moldova	1–1	51,672	Karol Świderski
38	UEFA Euro 2024 qualification	17 November 2023	Czech Republic	1–1	56,310	Jakub Piotrowski
39	Friendly	21 November 2023	Latvia	2–0	31,000	Przemysław Frankowski, Robert Lewandowski
40	UEFA Euro 2024 qualification play-offs	21 March 2024	Estonia	5–1	53,868	Przemysław Frankowski, Piotr Zieliński, Jakub Piotrowski, Karol Mets (o.g.), Sebastian Szymański
41	Friendly	7 June 2024	Ukraine	3–1	47,013	Sebastian Walukiewicz, Piotr Zieliński, Taras Romanczuk
42	Friendly	10 June 2024	Turkey	2–1	48,677	Karol Świderski, Nicola Zalewski
43	2024–25 UEFA Nations League	12 October 2024	Portugal	1–3	56,854	Piotr Zieliński
44	2024–25 UEFA Nations League	15 October 2024	Croatia	3–3	56,103	Piotr Zieliński, Nicola Zalewski, Sebastian Szymański
45	2024–25 UEFA Nations League	18 November 2024	Scotland	1–2	55,433	Kamil Piątkowski
46	2026 FIFA World Cup qualification	21 March 2025	Lithuania	1–0	55,738	Robert Lewandowski
47	2026 FIFA World Cup qualification	24 March 2025	Malta	2–0	45,872	2 x Karol Świderski
48	2026 FIFA World Cup qualification	14 November 2025	Netherlands	1–1	56,278	Jakub Kamiński
49	2026 FIFA World Cup qualification play-offs	26 March 2026	Albania	2–1	56,412	Robert Lewandowski, Piotr Zieliński
50	Friendly	3 June 2026	Nigeria	2–2	54,408	Kacper Potulski, Przemysław Wiśniewski
51	2026–27 UEFA Nations League	25 September 2026	Bosnia and Herzegovina	0–0	46,775	–––
52	2026–27 UEFA Nations League	2 October 2026	Romania	6–0	51,054	3 x Robert Lewandowski, Virgil Ghiță (o.g.), Piotr Zieliński, Jan Bednarek

=== Euro 2012 matches ===
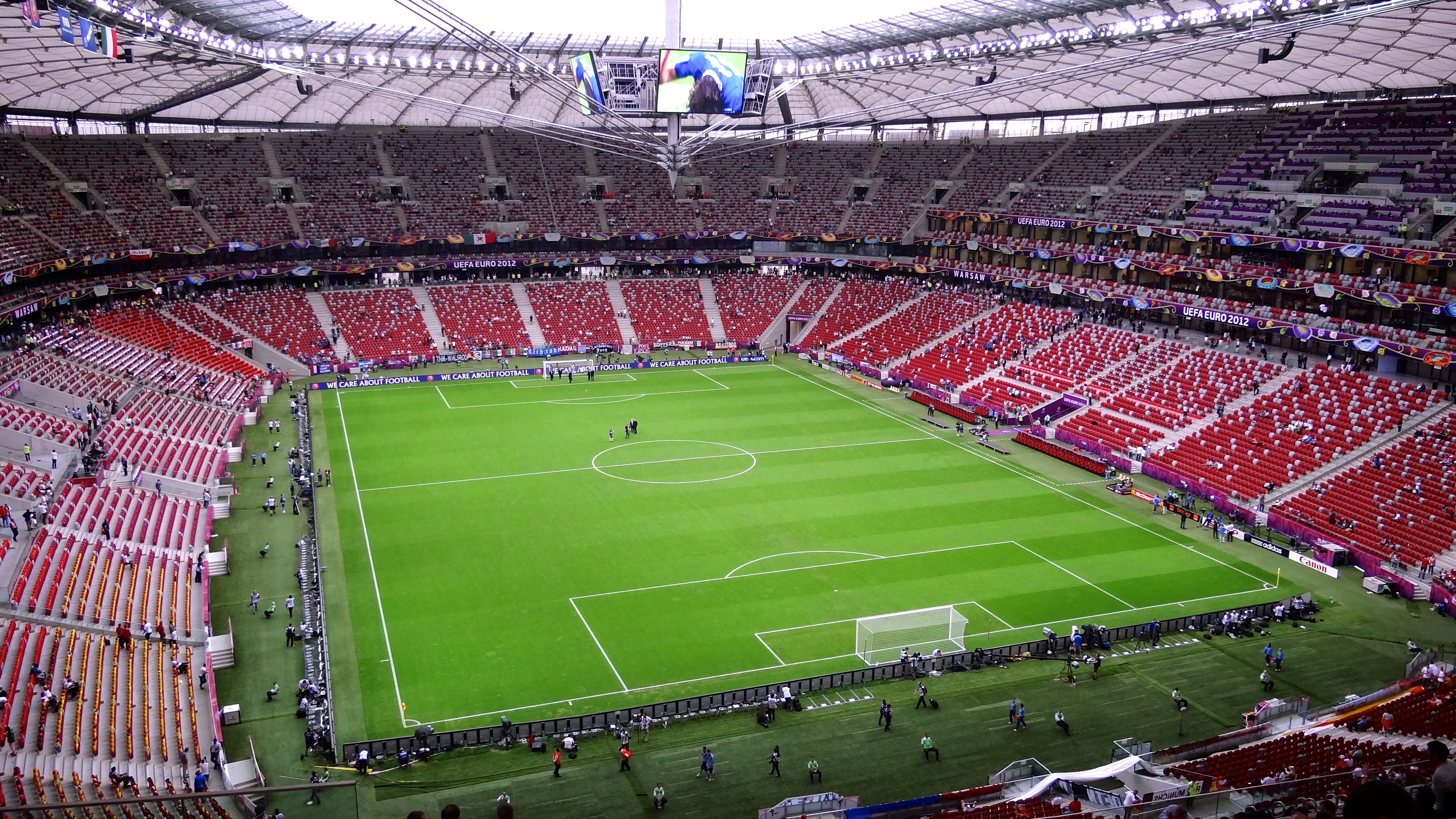
Interior of the National Stadium before the UEFA Euro 2012 semi-final match between Germany and Italy on 28 June 2012

The stadium was one of the venues for the UEFA Euro 2012 hosted jointly by Poland and Ukraine. Three Group A matches, a quarter-final and a semi-final were played there (with the other matches in that group played at the Wrocław Stadium).

The following matches were played at the stadium during the UEFA Euro 2012:

Date	Time (CEST)	Team #1	Result	Team #2	Round	Scorers	Attendance
8 June 2012	18:00	Poland	1–1	Greece	Group A	Robert Lewandowski 17'; Dimitris Salpingidis 51'	56,070
12 June 2012	20:45	Poland	1–1	Russia	Group A	Alan Dzagoev 37'; Jakub Błaszczykowski 57'	55,920
16 June 2012	20:45	Greece	1–0	Russia	Group A	Giorgos Karagounis 45+2'	55,614
21 June 2012	20:45	Czech Republic	0–1	Portugal	Quarter-final	Cristiano Ronaldo 79'	55,590
28 June 2012	20:45	Germany	1–2	Italy	Semi-final	Mario Balotelli 20',36'; Mesut Özil 90'+2 (pen.)	55,540

=== American football ===
On 15 July 2012, two weeks after the UEFA Euro 2012, the National Stadium hosted the VII SuperFinal PLFA (more commonly known as the Polish Bowl), the championship game of the Polish American Football League.

=== Science Picnic ===
The stadium is the venue for the Science Picnic, an annual science education fair, since 2013. During the 2013 Science Picnic, the stadium was visited by 142,573 people, which was at the time record attendance at any type of event held at the stadium.

=== 2014 FIVB Volleyball Men's World Championship ===
On 30 August 2014, the National Stadium hosted the opening ceremony and match (Poland vs. Serbia) of the 2014 FIVB Volleyball Men's World Championship. Poland beat Serbia in front of 61,500 spectators – a new record for an FIVB volleyball match.

Date	Time		Score		Set 1	Set 2	Set 3	Set 4	Set 5	Total	Report
30 Aug	20:15	Poland	3–0	Serbia	25–19	25–18	25–18			75–55	P2 P3

=== Speedway ===
The stadium also hosts motorcycle speedway races, with a round of the Speedway Grand Prix (the World Championship) being held at the stadium called the Speedway Grand Prix of Poland. It has been held in 2015, 2016, 2017, 2018, 2019, 2022, 2023, 2024, and 2025, and is scheduled to be held in 2026.

== Concerts ==
Concerts at Warsaw National Stadium
Date	Artist	Tour	Attendance
1 August 2012	Madonna	The MDNA Tour	38,699
19 September 2012	Coldplay	Mylo Xyloto Tour	40,492
25–26 May 2013	Beyoncé; Basement Jaxx; Fatboy Slim; Cypress Hill; The Offspring; Tinie Tempah	The Mrs. Carter Show World Tour; Orange Warsaw Festival	49,034
22 June 2013	Paul McCartney	Out There! Tour	
25 July 2013	Depeche Mode	The Delta Machine Tour	53,181
20 August 2013	Roger Waters	The Wall Live	32,549
13–15 June 2014	Kings of Leon; Queens of the Stone Age; Florence and the Machine; David Guetta; Kasabian; Snoop Dogg; OutKast; Timbaland; Bring Me the Horizon; Pixies; Hurts; The Wombats; French Films; The Pretty Reckless; Chase & Status DJ Set & MC Rage; I Am Giant	Orange Warsaw Festival	
11 July 2014	Metallica; Alice in Chains; Anthrax; Kvelertak	Sonisphere Festival	
25 July 2015	AC/DC	Rock or Bust World Tour	
22 August 2015	Violetta	Violetta Live	
5 August 2016	Rihanna	Anti World Tour	
18 June 2017	Coldplay	A Head Full of Dreams Tour	57,615
23 July 2017	Depeche Mode	Global Spirit Tour	54,659
30 June 2018	Beyoncé; Jay-Z	On the Run II Tour	53,500
8 July 2018	The Rolling Stones	No Filter Tour	
11–12 August 2018	Ed Sheeran	÷ Tour	104,836
26 June 2019	Phil Collins	Not Dead Yet Tour	
12 July 2019	Bon Jovi	This House Is Not For Sale Tour	
20 July 2019	Pink	Beautiful Trauma World Tour	46,964
21 August 2019	Metallica	WorldWired Tour	53,877
20 June 2022	Guns N' Roses	Guns N' Roses 2020 Tour	49,026
8 July 2022	Coldplay	Music of the Spheres World Tour	57,574
16 July 2022	Rammstein	Rammstein Stadium Tour	52,669
24 July 2022	Iron Maiden	Legacy of the Beast World Tour	
25–26 August 2022	Ed Sheeran	+–=÷× Tour	146,340
21 June 2023	Red Hot Chili Peppers; Iggy Pop	Global Stadium Tour	45,736
27–28 June 2023	Beyoncé	Renaissance World Tour	108,141
2 July 2023	Harry Styles	Love On Tour	54,824
16 July 2023	Pink	Summer Carnival	46,969
2 August 2023	Depeche Mode	Memento Mori World Tour	50,107
9 August 2023	The Weeknd	After Hours til Dawn Tour	62,007
14 August 2023	Imagine Dragons	Mercury World Tour	
26 August 2023	Dawid Podsiadło		
22 September 2023	Sanah	Uczta Nad Ucztami	
23 September 2023	The Boyz; Mamamoo+ Kep1er; CIX; Zerobaseone; SF9 (G)I-dle; Shownu X Hyungwon	KPOP NATION	
5 and 7 July 2024	Metallica	M72 World Tour	154,258
1–3 August 2024	Taylor Swift	The Eras Tour	
17 June 2025	Justin Timberlake		
27 June 2025	Quebonafide	Akt II: Ostatni koncert	
28 June 2025	Quebonafide	Akt II: Ostatni koncert	
4 July 2025	AC/DC	Power Up Tour	
12 July 2025	Guns N' Roses	Because What You Want & What You Get; Are Two Completely Different Things Tour	
24 July 2025	Jennifer Lopez	Up All Night: Live in 2025	70,000
2 August 2025	Iron Maiden	Run for Your Lives World Tour	
6 August 2025	Kendrick Lamar; SZA	Grand National Tour	
9 August 2025	Max Korzh		
19 September 2025	Sanah	sanah na stadionach	
20 September 2025	Sanah	sanah na stadionach	
15 May 2026	Mata	The Best of	
16 May 2026	Mata	#MATA2040	
22-23 May 2026	Taco Hemingway	†††OUR	
15 June 2026	Foo Fighters	Take Cover Tour 2026	
27-28 June 2026	Dawid Podsiadło	Obrotowy Tour	
14 July 2026	Bad Bunny	Debí Tirar Más Fotos World Tour	
18-19 July 2026	System of a Down	System of a Down: UK & Europe 2026 Tour	
23 July 2026	Pitbull	I'm Back Tour	
4-5 August 2026	the Weeknd	After Hours til Dawn Tour	
16 August 2026	Andrea Bocelli	Romanza - 30th Anniversary World Tour	
4 September 2026	Sanah	sanah NA STADIONACH	
14 July 2027	Karol G	Viajando Por El Mundo Tropitour	

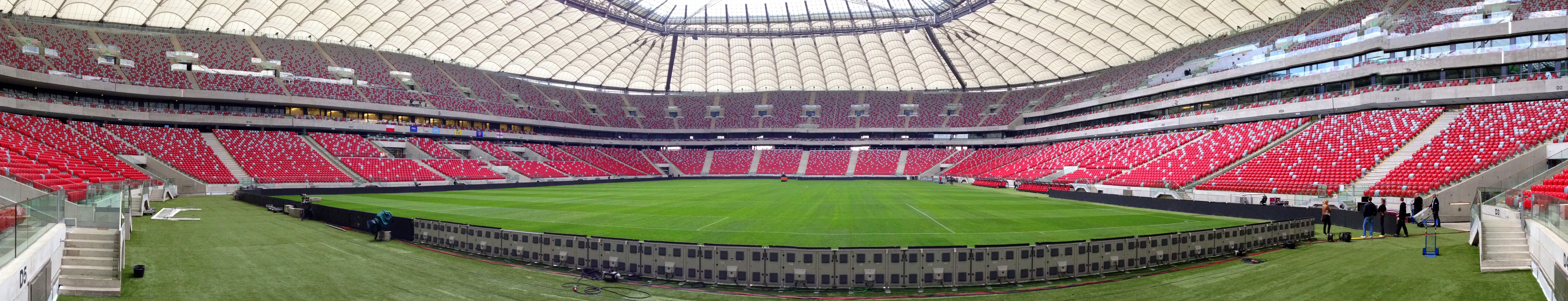
A Panorama view of the stadium interior

== See also ==
- A2 autostrada – Motorway in Poland connecting Poznań, Łódź and Warsaw with Germany and Belarus
- List of football stadiums in Poland
- Lists of stadiums
- Warsaw Chopin Airport – Airport in Warsaw, Poland
- Warsaw-Modlin Mazovia Airport – International airport located in Nowy Dwór Mazowiecki, Poland

Preceded by Juventus Stadium; Turin	UEFA Europa League; Final venue 2015	Succeeded by St. Jakob-Park; Basel
Preceded by Karaiskakis Stadium; Piraeus	UEFA Super Cup; Match venue 2024	Succeeded by Stadio Friuli; Udine
