= Chyby =

Chyby can refer to:

- Chyby, Świętokrzyskie Voivodeship
- Chyby, Greater Poland Voivodeship
