= Alfreda Markowska =

Polish Holocaust survivor (1926–2021)

Alfreda Noncia Markowska
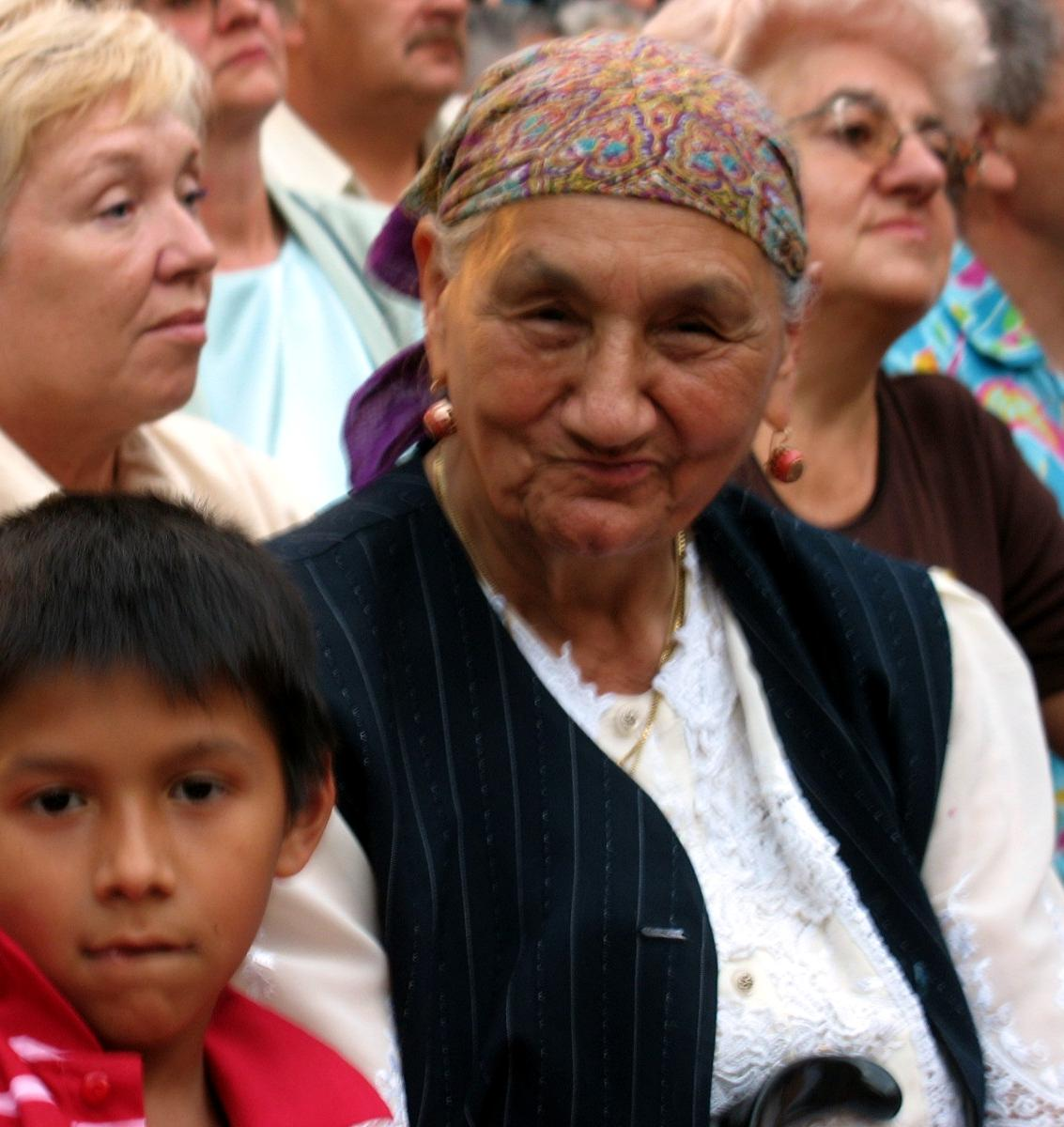
- Alfreda Noncia Markowska
- Born: May 10, 1926; Poland
- Died: January 30, 2021 (aged 94)
- Known for: Rescuing Jewish and Roma children during World War II
- Awards: Order of Polonia Restituta

Alfreda Noncia Markowska (10 May 1926 – 30 January 2021) was a Polish-Romani woman who during World War II saved approximately fifty Jewish and Roma children from death in the Holocaust and the Porajmos genocide.

== Biography ==
Markowska was born in a travelling Polska Roma tabor (a mobile camp) in an area around Stanisławów (Ivano-Frankivsk), in the Kresy region of the Second Polish Republic. Her father, Jan, was a horse trader, and her mother, Adel, practiced palmistry; both were members of the nomadic Polska Roma community.

In 1939, the German invasion of Poland caught her in Lwów (Lviv). After the Soviet Union also invaded Poland as part of the Molotov–Ribbentrop pact between Stalin and Hitler, her tabor moved to the German occupied part of Poland. In 1941 the Germans murdered all the members of her family (65 to 85 people), including her parents and siblings, in a massacre near Biała Podlaska. Alfreda was the only one to survive, as she traveled to a local village to buy food that morning. There, a woman warned her against going back to the tabor and told her to hide in her barn.

She spent several days searching the local forests for the mass grave of her family. She made her way to Rozwadów where in 1942, at the age of 16, she married. She and her husband were caught in a street roundup while visiting Stanisławów by Ukrainian police who handed them over to the Germans, but the couple managed to escape. Subsequently, they were forced to move into Roma ghettos in Lublin, Łódź, and Bełżec but they fled these as well and settled back in Rozwadów, where the Germans had organized a labor camp for Roma.

=== Rescue missions ===
In Rozwadów, Alfreda was hired on the railway and managed to obtain a work permit (Kennkarte) which gave her some protection against further arrests. She became involved in saving Jews and Roma, particularly children, from death at the hands of the Nazis. She would travel to sites of known massacres of Jewish and Roma populations and look for survivors. Markowska would bring them back to her home, hide them and obtain false documents which protected them from the Germans. She personally saved an estimated 50 children. Years later, when asked why she was not afraid to help, Markowska stated that at the time she did not expect to live through the war herself anyway, so fear was not an issue.

In 1944 the Soviets liberated the area. Because of the policy of the Red Army to forcibly conscript Roma into its ranks, Markowska along with her husband and some of the children she had saved (including some German children who sought to flee Soviet soldiers) fled westward, first into central Poland and then into the so-called "Recovered Territories" in what is now western Poland.

After the war, the communist authorities of the People's Republic of Poland initiated a campaign to force the Roma to settle and abandon their traditional lifestyle. As a result, she and her family lived first near Poznań - in Przeźmierowo - then, after her husband's death, in Gorzów Wielkopolski.

In October 2006, Alfreda Markowska was awarded the Commander's Cross with Star of the Order of Polonia Restituta for saving Jewish and Roma children during World War II. At that time, then-President of Poland Lech Kaczyński commended her "for heroism and uncommon bravery, for exceptional merit in saving human lives".

Markowska died on 30 January 2021, at the age of 94.
