= Kokoszczyn, Greater Poland Voivodeship =

Kokoszczyn
- Village
- Location within Poland
- Coordinates: 52°30′N 16°39′E
- Country: Poland
- Voivodeship: Greater Poland
- County: Poznań
- Gmina: Tarnowo Podgórne
- Population: 199

Kokoszczyn [kɔˈkɔʂt͡ʂɨn] is a village in the administrative district of Gmina Tarnowo Podgórne, within Poznań County, Greater Poland Voivodeship, in west-central Poland.
