= Gmina Tarnowo Podgórne =

Gmina Tarnowo Podgórne Tarnowo Podgórne Commune
- Gmina
- Flag Coat of arms Brandmark
- Interactive map of Gmina Tarnowo Podgórne
- Coordinates (Tarnowo Podgórne): 52°28′N 16°40′E
- Country: Poland
- Voivodeship: Greater Poland
- County: Poznań County
- Seat: Tarnowo Podgórne

Area
  - Total: 101.4 km^{2} (39.2 sq mi)

Population (2006)
  - Total: 18,690
  - Density: 184.3/km^{2} (477.4/sq mi)
- Website: http://www.tarnowo-podgorne.pl

Gmina Tarnowo Podgórne is a rural gmina (administrative district) in Poznań County, Greater Poland Voivodeship, in west-central Poland. Its seat is the village of Tarnowo Podgórne, which lies approximately 19 kilometres (12 mi) north-west of the regional capital Poznań.

The gmina covers an area of 101.4 square kilometres (39.2 sq mi), and as of 2006 its total population is 18,690.

== Villages ==
Gmina Tarnowo Podgórne contains the villages and settlements of Baranowo, Batorowo, Ceradz Kościelny, Chyby, Góra, Jankowice, Kokoszczyn, Lusówko, Lusowo, Przeźmierowo, Rumianek, Sady, Sierosław, Swadzim, Tarnowo Podgórne and Wysogotowo.

== Neighbouring gminas ==
Gmina Tarnowo Podgórne is bordered by the city of Poznań and by the gminas of Buk, Dopiewo, Duszniki, Kaźmierz and Rokietnica.
