= Swadzim, Greater Poland Voivodeship =

Swadzim
- Village
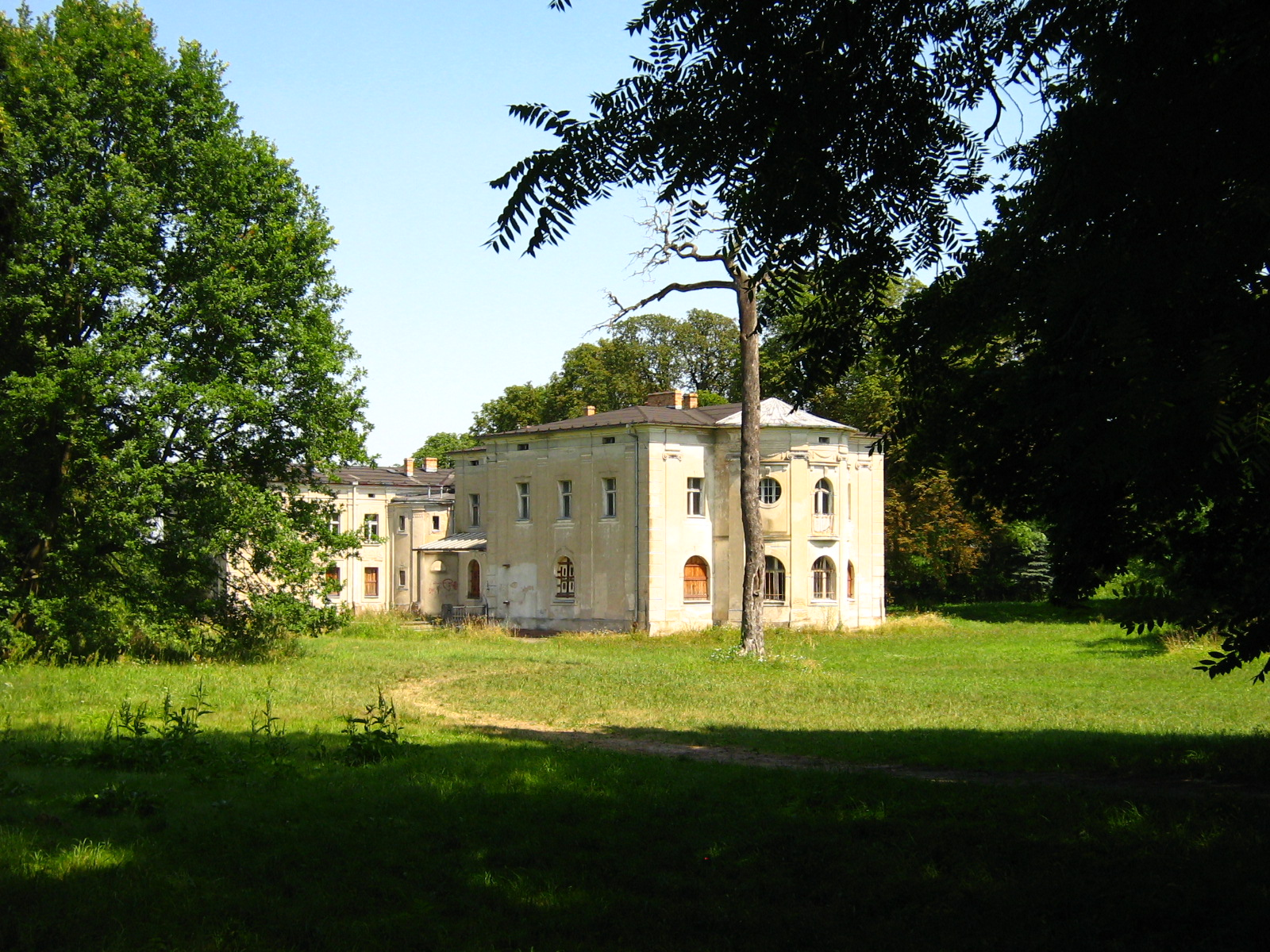
- Palace in Swadzim

- Location within Poland
- Coordinates: 52°26′23″N 16°44′44″E
- Country: Poland
- Voivodeship: Greater Poland
- County: Poznań
- Gmina: Tarnowo Podgórne

Population
  - Total: 385

Swadzim [ˈsfad͡ʑim] is a village in the administrative district of Gmina Tarnowo Podgórne, within Poznań County, Greater Poland Voivodeship, in west-central Poland.
