= Lusowo, Greater Poland Voivodeship =

Lusowo
- Village
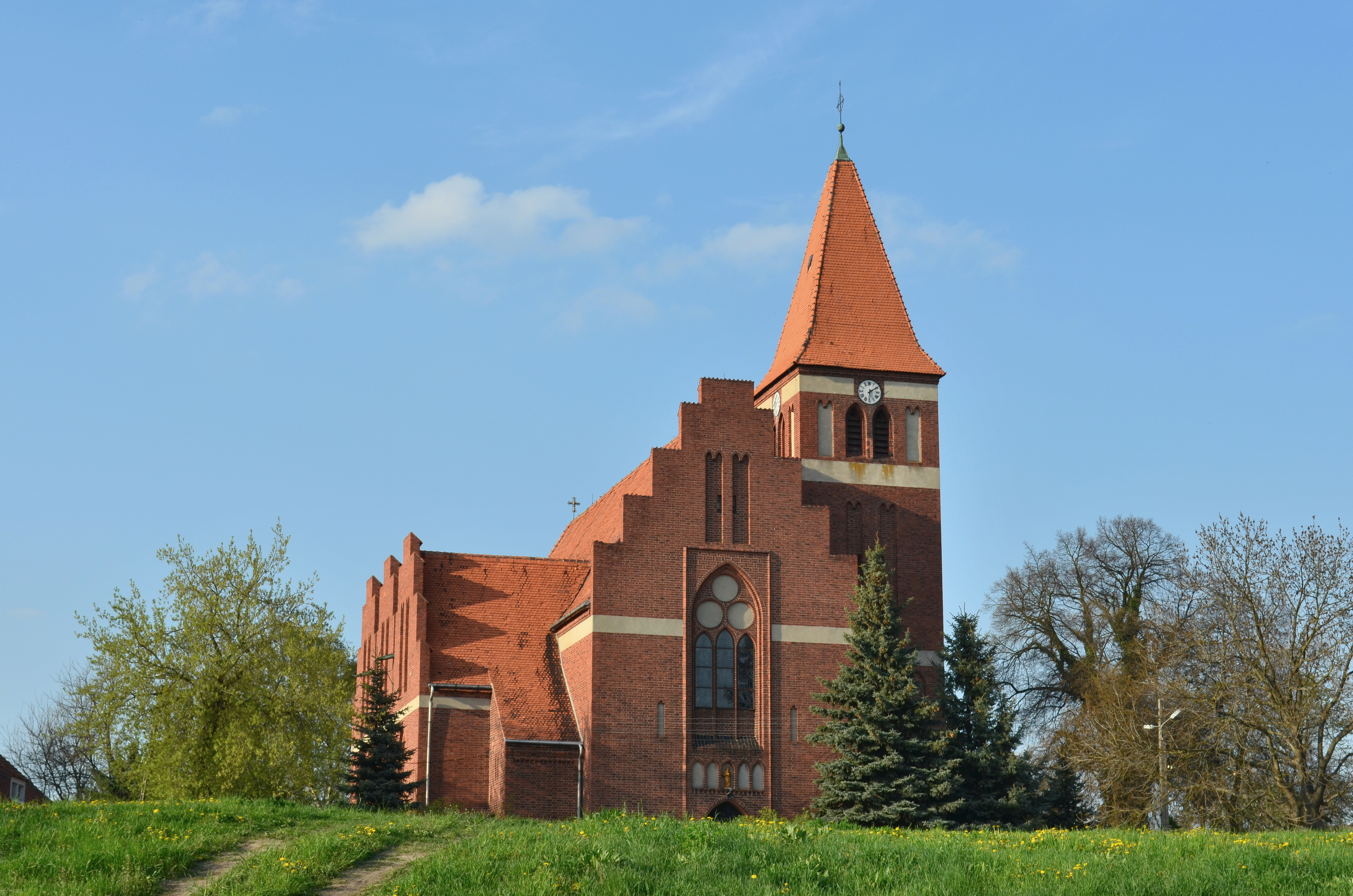
- Church of Saints Hedwig and James the Apostle

- Location within Poland
- Coordinates: 52°26′N 16°41′E
- Country: Poland
- Voivodeship: Greater Poland
- County: Poznań
- Gmina: Tarnowo Podgórne

Population
  - Total: 1,155
- Website: http://www.lusowo.info.pl/

Lusowo [luˈsɔvɔ] is a village in the administrative district of Gmina Tarnowo Podgórne, within Poznań County, Greater Poland Voivodeship, in west-central Poland.

== Notable people ==
- Józef Dowbor-Muśnicki (1867–1937), Polish military general
- Agnieszka Dowbor-Muśnicka (7 September 1919 – 20 or 21 June 1940 ) member, Polish resistance against Nazi occupiers in World War II
