= Lusówko =

- Village
- Location within Poland
- Coordinates: 52°26′N 16°39′E
- Country: Poland
- Voivodeship: Greater Poland
- County: Poznań
- Gmina: Tarnowo Podgórne
- Population: 2,108

Lusówko [luˈsufkɔ] is a village in the administrative district of Gmina Tarnowo Podgórne, within Poznań County, Greater Poland Voivodeship, in west-central Poland.

In 2016 the private Lusowko Platanus Observatory was established in Lusowko (IAU code K80). It carries out astronomical observations of Solar system minor planets and popularizes astronomy in the region.
