= Góra, Gmina Tarnowo Podgórne =

Góra
- Village
- Location within Poland
- Coordinates: 52°28′47″N 16°38′03″E
- Country: Poland
- Voivodeship: Greater Poland
- County: Poznań
- Gmina: Tarnowo Podgórne

Góra [ˈɡura] is a village in the administrative district of Gmina Tarnowo Podgórne, in Poznań County, Greater Poland Voivodeship, in west-central Poland.
