= Ceradz Kościelny =

- Village
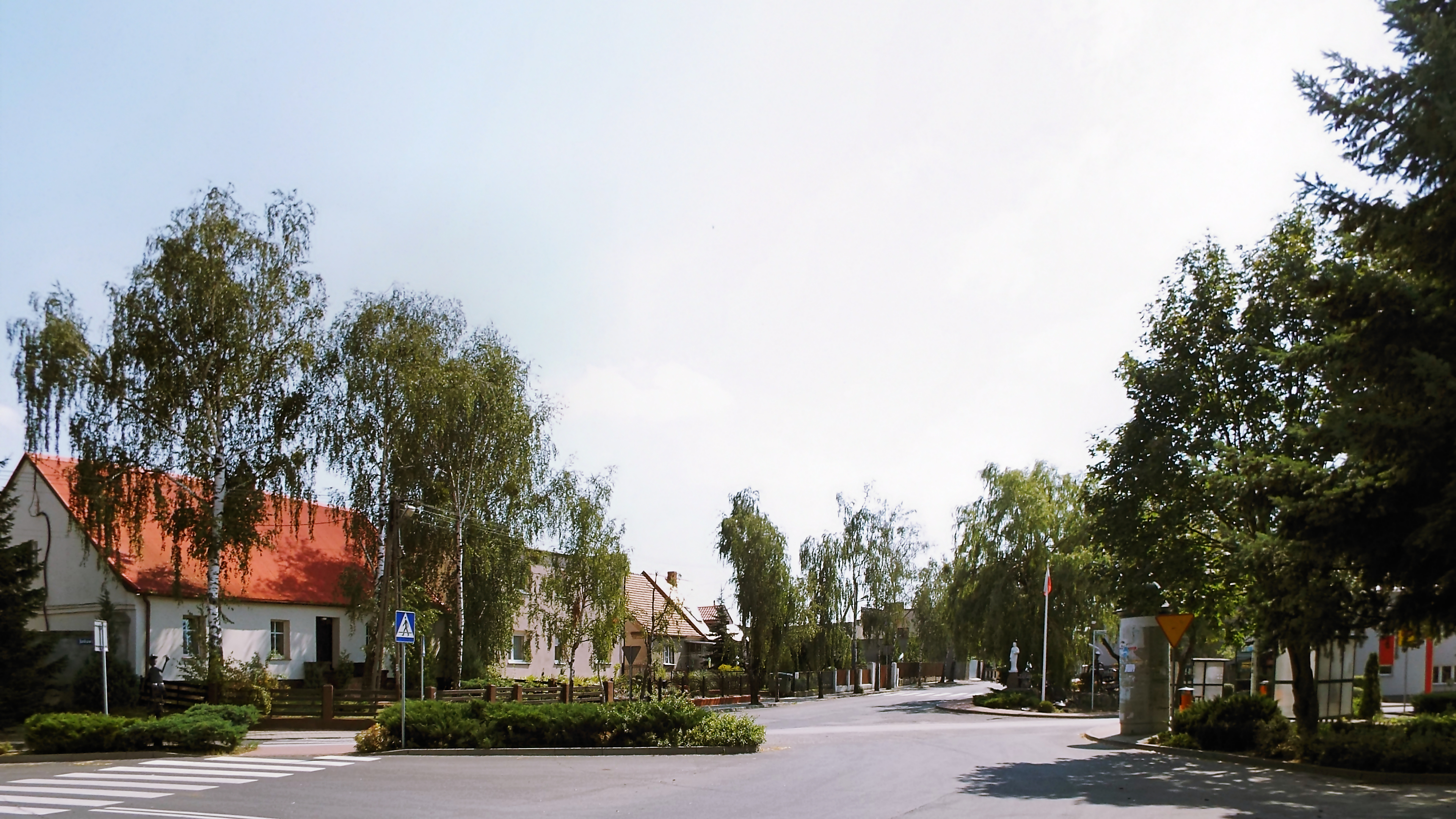

- Location within Poland
- Coordinates: 52°26′N 16°35′E
- Country: Poland
- Voivodeship: Greater Poland
- County: Poznań
- Gmina: Tarnowo Podgórne
- Population: 432

Ceradz Kościelny [ˈt͡sɛrat͡s kɔɕˈt͡ɕɛlnɨ] is a village in the administrative district of Gmina Tarnowo Podgórne, within Poznań County, Greater Poland Voivodeship, in west-central Poland.
