= Jankowice, Greater Poland Voivodeship =

Jankowice
- Village
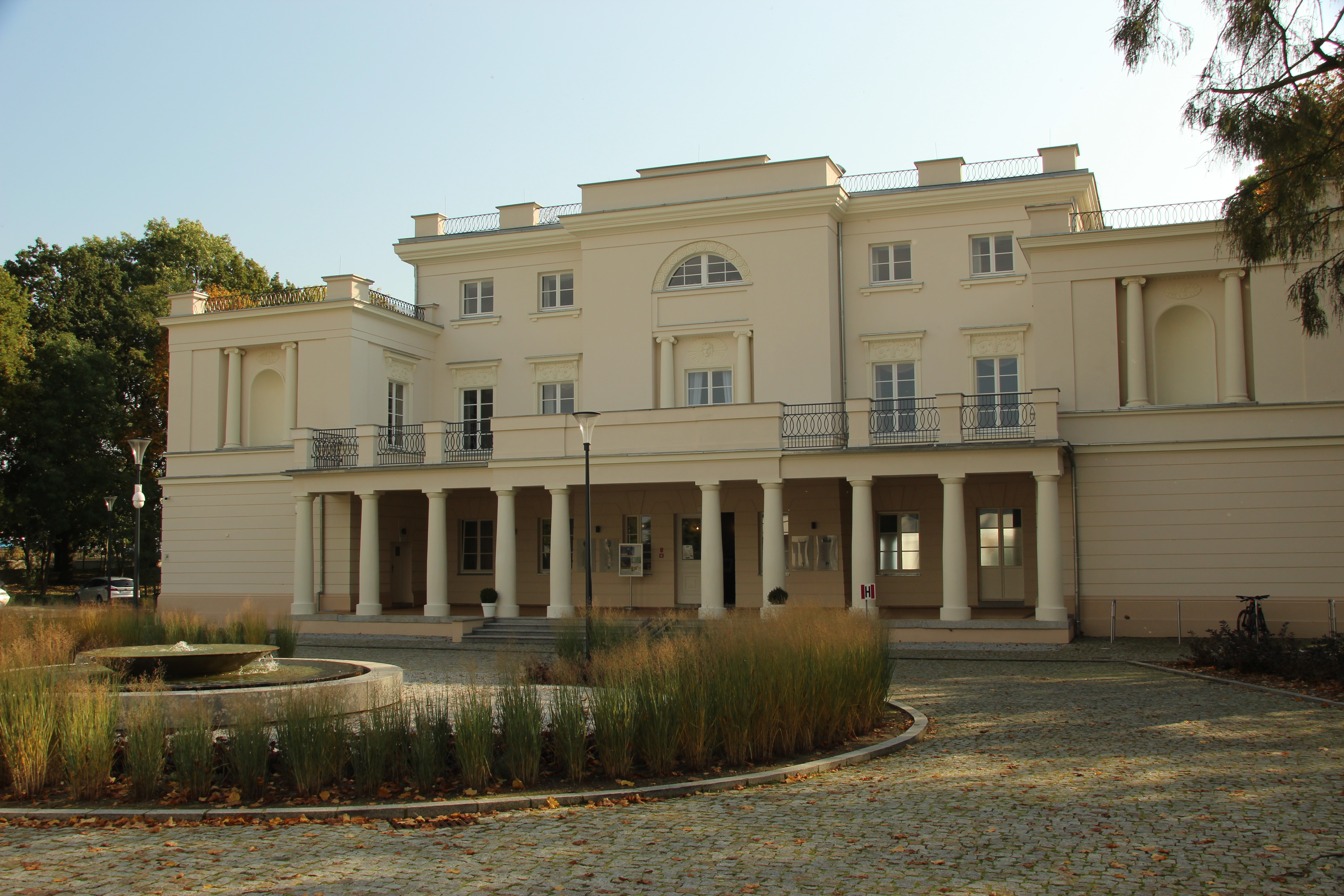
- Palace in Jankowice

- Location within Poland
- Coordinates: 52°26′N 16°37′E
- Country: Poland
- Voivodeship: Greater Poland
- County: Poznań
- Gmina: Tarnowo Podgórne

Jankowice ([jankɔˈvit͡sɛ]; German: Johannesdorf), is a village in the administrative district of Gmina Tarnowo Podgórne, within Poznań County, Greater Poland Voivodeship, in west-central Poland.
