= Janina Lewandowska =

Polish aviator (1908–1940)

Janina Antonina Lewandowska
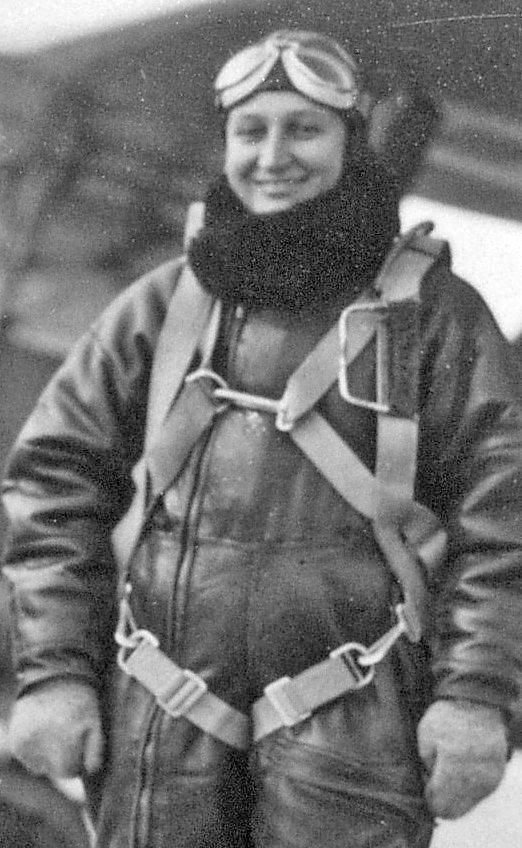
- Lewandowska before 1939
- Born: Janina Antonina Dowbor-Muśnicka; 22 April 1908; Kharkiv, Russian Empire
- Died: 22 April 1940 (aged 32); Katyn forest, USSR
- Occupation: Pilot
- Spouse: Mieczyslaw Lewandowski
- Father: Józef Dowbor-Muśnicki

Janina Antonina Lewandowska (22 April 1908 – 22 April 1940) was a Polish pilot murdered in the Katyn massacre by Soviet forces. She was among the first women prisoners of war in World War II and the only female victim of Katyn.

== Early life ==
Lewandowska (née Dowbor-Muśnicka) was born 22 April 1908, in Kharkiv in the Russian Empire. Her father, Józef Dowbor-Muśnicki, was a successful Polish military general. Following his involvement in the Greater Poland uprising in 1919, the family settled in a palace in the village of Lusowo, near Poznań. Lewandowska had a sister named Agnieszka and two brothers: Giedymin and Olgierd.

Her father taught her horse riding, skiing, and swimming. She attended Generałowa Zamoyska and Helena Modrzejewska High School in Poznań. Next, because she wanted to be a singer, she attended the Music Academy in Poznań, but her father was opposed to her having a music career. Lewandowska was employed as an assistant at a post office and joined the Postal Przysposobienie Wojskowe military youth organisation.

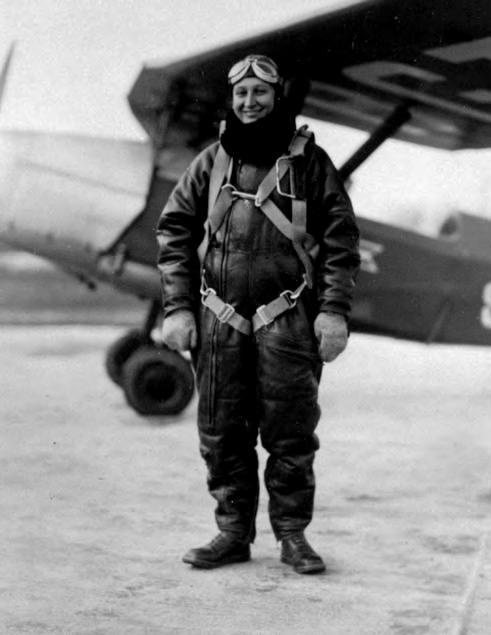
Lewandowska standing in front of a RWD 8 trainer aircraft

Lewandowska familiarized herself with aviation due to her older brother, who was an aviation officer, and with whom she first visited the Ławica Airport. As a teenager, she joined the Poznań Flying Club. She finished gliding training, and also received a sport pilot license. Next, at the Air Force Academy in Ławica, she got her motor pilot diploma. She also had a parachutist certificate. At the age of 20, she became the first European woman to parachute from a height of over five kilometers. She learned to fly light aircraft by 1937. She was also trained in telegraphy at the Communication Training Center in Zegrze.

In 1936, she first met instructor-pilot Mieczyslaw Lewandowski. They got married in August 1939.

== Military career ==
In August 1939, Lewandowska was drafted for service with the 3rd Military Aviation Regiment stationed near Poznań. Following the start of the Second World War, on 3 September 1939 she arrived in Nekla by train, and joined other soldiers on their way to the east. After the Soviet invasion of Poland, Lewandowska's unit received the order to cross the border into Hungary. On 22 September, in the area of Husiatyn, her unit was taken prisoner by Soviet forces. Lewandowska was one of only two officers in the group. They were taken to the POW Camp for Polish Officers in Ostashkov, Russia, and later to the camp in Kozelsk.

== Death ==
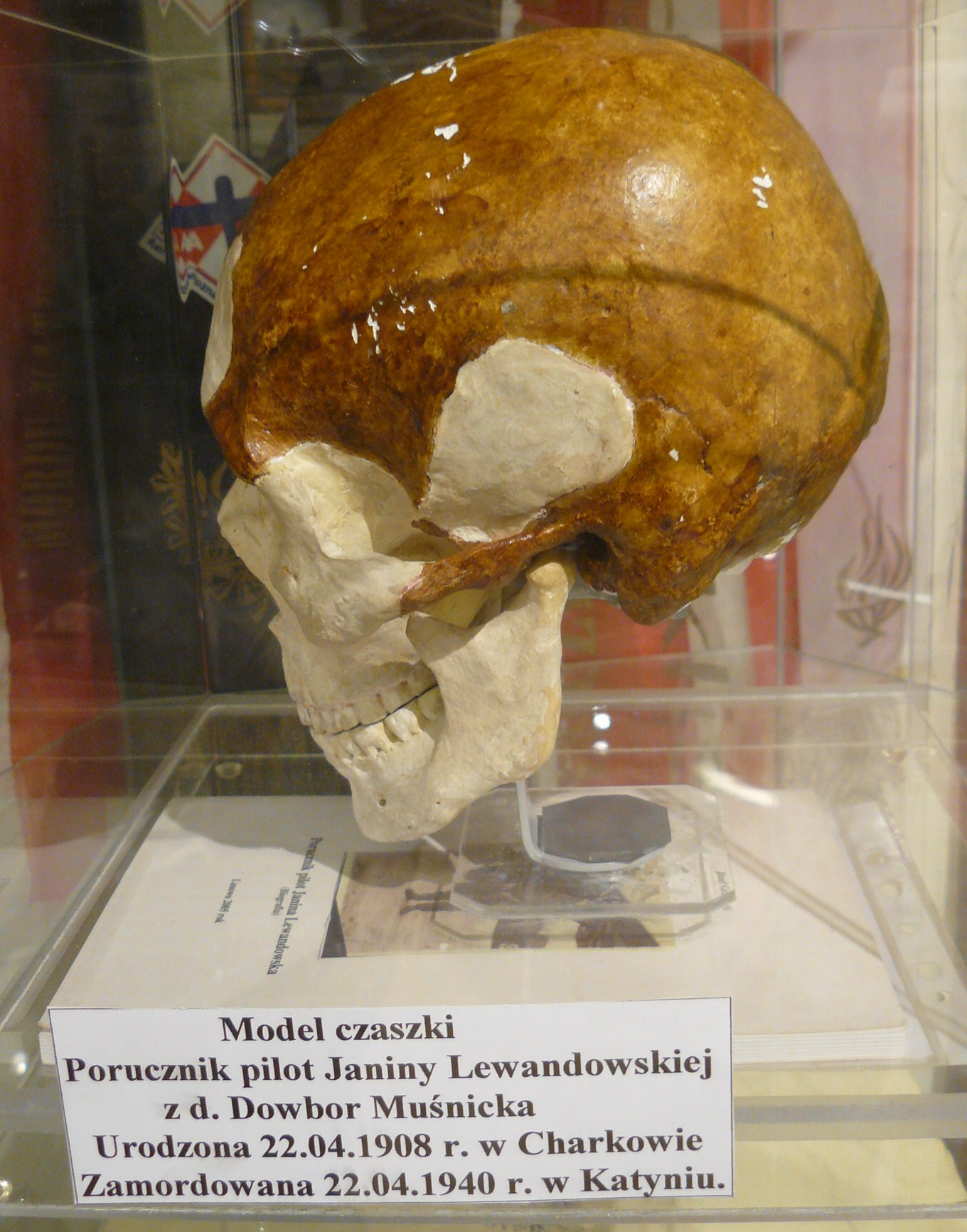
A model of Lewandowska's skull, displayed at the Museum of Greater Poland uprising in Lusowo

In March 1940, Soviets started deporting Polish officers from Kozelsk. The group that included Lewandowska departed on 20 April 1940. Two days later, on 22 April, on her 32nd birthday, she was executed with a shot to the back of the head in the Katyn forest.

Her body was among the ones exhumed by Germans from the mass graves in Katyn in 1943. It was confirmed in 1997 that one skull taken from the Katyn graves by Gerhard Buhtz and kept in the collection of Bolesław Popielski, was that of Lewandowska. Her remains were buried in 2005 in her family's grave at the cemetery in Lusowo. Minister of National Defence Aleksander Szczygło posthumously promoted Lewandowska to the rank of lieutenant.

== Commemorations ==
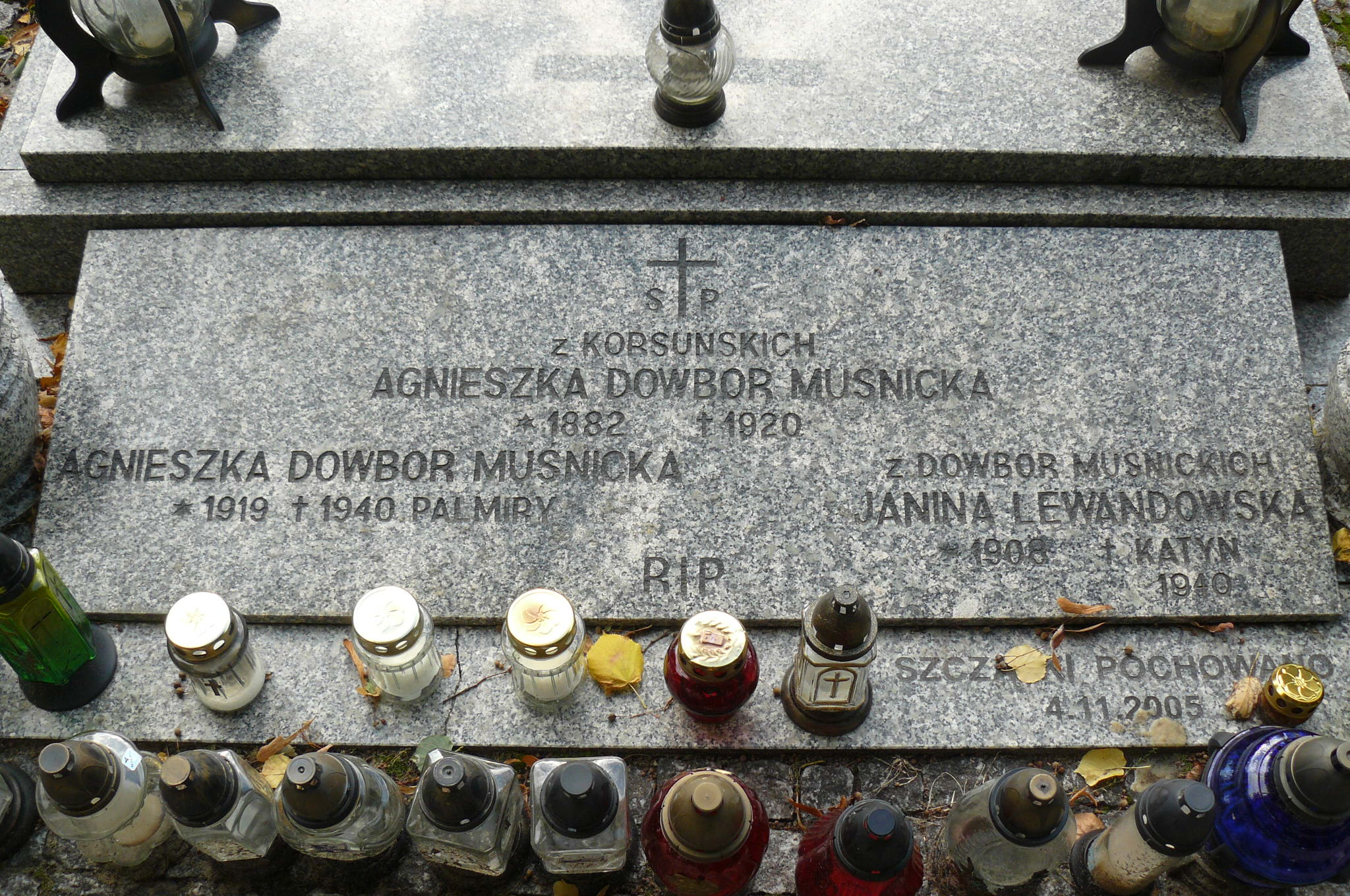
The grave stone commemorating Lewandowska and her sister Agnieszka Dowbor-Muśnicka at the family tomb at Lusowo cemetery

- At the base of a monument erected in Lusowo in 2015 to General Józef Dowbor-Muśnicki, both of his daughters are also commemorated: "Janina Lewandowska, murdered in 1940 by the NKVD in Katyn, and Agnieszka Dowbor-Muśnicka, murdered by the Germans in Palmiry."
- On 19 March 2020, the National Bank of Poland introduced a commemorative silver coin with a face value of 10 zlotys. The coin, called "Katyń-Palmiry 1940," remembers the two murdered sisters. On one side of the coin, Janina appears next to the word "Katyn." The other side features a likeness of Agnieszka and the word "Palmiry."

== See also ==
- History of Poland (1939–1945)

== Bibliography ==
- Bauer, Piotr (30 July 1989). "Wojenne Losy Janiny Lewandowskiej" [War of the Lives of Janina Lewandowska]. Skrzydlata Polska (in Polish): 31.
- Muszynski, Adam (1982). lista katynska. London: Gryf Publications. OCLC 246675334.
- Zdziarski, Maciej (2023), Sportowcy dla Niepodległej: Katyń, Kraków: Instytut Łukasiewicza, ISBN 978-83-967147-0-1
