= Baranowo, Gmina Tarnowo Podgórne =

Baranowo
- Village
- Location within Poland
- Coordinates: 52°26′16″N 16°47′28″E
- Country: Poland
- Voivodeship: Greater Poland
- County: Poznań
- Gmina: Tarnowo Podgórne
- Population: 2,202

Baranowo [baraˈnɔvɔ] is a village in the administrative district of Gmina Tarnowo Podgórne, within Poznań County, Greater Poland Voivodeship, in west-central Poland.
