= Józef Dowbor-Muśnicki =

Polish military officer (1867–1937)

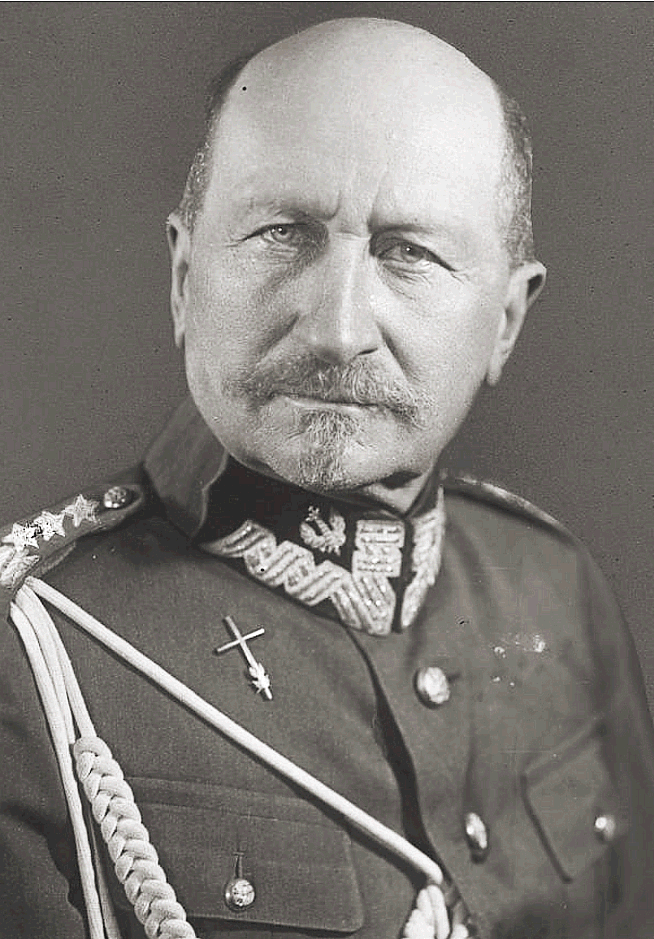
- Born: 25 October 1867; Garbów, Radom Governorate, Congress Poland, Russian Empire
- Died: 26 October 1937 (aged 70); Batorowo, Second Polish Republic
- Military career
- Allegiance: Russian Empire; Second Polish Republic
- Service years: 1884–1920
- Rank: Lieutenant general (Generał broni)
- Conflicts: Russo-Japanese War; World War I Russian Civil War; Greater Poland Uprising (1918–1919)

Józef Dowbor-Muśnicki (Iosif Romanovich while in the Russian military; sometimes also Dowbór-Muśnicki; Lithuanian: Juozapas Daubaras-Musnickas; 25 October 1867 – 26 October 1937) was a Polish general, serving with the Imperial Russian and then Polish armies. He was also the military commander of the Greater Poland Uprising.

== Early life ==
Dowbor-Muśnicki was born in the Garbów (near Sandomierz) in an estate in the Radom Governorate of Congress Poland, the part of Poland that was then a part of the Russian Empire. His father was Roman Muśnicki, the owner of Garbów, descended from the Lithuanian Dowborów (Daubor) family (Przyjaciel coat of arms), who settled in Sandomierz during the 17th century. Józef was the younger brother of Konstanty, also a lieutenant general. Their mother was Antonina née Wierzbicki.

His family traced its roots to medieval Polish nobility of evangelical reformed denomination. Dowbor received his basic education in the Nikolayevskiy Cadet Corps (Saint Petersburg).

== Service in the Russian Military (1884–1914) ==
In 1884 he joined the Russian military and graduated from the 2nd Konstantinovskoye Military School (Saint Petersburg) in 1888. After serving in the Fanagorisky Grenadiers regiment, he studied at the General Staff Academy and graduated in 1902. He served in Manchuria during the Russo-Japanese War as a staff officer with the First Siberian Corps. On 11 September 1906 he was appointed a senior staff adjutant of the Irkutsk Military District and on 2 March 1908, a staff officer of the Xth Corps. On 9 November 1910 he became chief of staff of the 10th Infantry Division and on 21 April 1912 he was appointed to the same position with the 7th Infantry Division.

== World War I (1914–1917) ==
At the beginning of World War I, Dowbor-Muśnicki was put in command of the 14th Siberian Infantry Regiment. On 3 September 1915 Dowbor-Muśnicki, by then a general, was assigned to the staff of the Russian 1st Army. On 25 February 1916 he was put in charge of the 123rd Infantry Division and on 7 November 1916 of the 38th Infantry Division. He was temporarily put in charge of the staff of the Russian 1st Army on 17 January 1917, 5 weeks before the February Revolution that overthrew Tsar Nicholas II.

== 1917 Revolution ==
In the immediate aftermath of the February Revolution, Dowbor-Muśnicki continued his military career and was appointed commander of the XXXVIIIth Corps on 28 April 1917 and made Lieutenant General on 5 May 1917. In the meantime, however, the Russian Provisional Government's obvious weakness, its half-hearted declaration of the right of nations to self-determination and Germany's promises of autonomy in occupied Poland stirred up long suppressed nationalist feelings among ethnic Poles living within the Russian Empire. Roughly 700,000 of them were serving in the Russian military by 1917 and they began forming a Polish army to fight for a "united and free Poland" with the assent of the Provisional Government. In August, the newly formed Main Polish Military Executive Committee appointed Dowbor-Muśnicki Commissar of the Petrograd Military District and on August 23 (Old Style) he was appointed commander of the newly formed Polish 1st Corps in Russia. The reorganization process was complicated by the October Revolution of 1917, which brought Bolsheviks to power, but Dowbor-Muśnicki was able to take advantage of the new government's weakness and general anarchy to form 3 divisions in Belarus by January 1918.

== Against the Bolsheviks (1918) ==
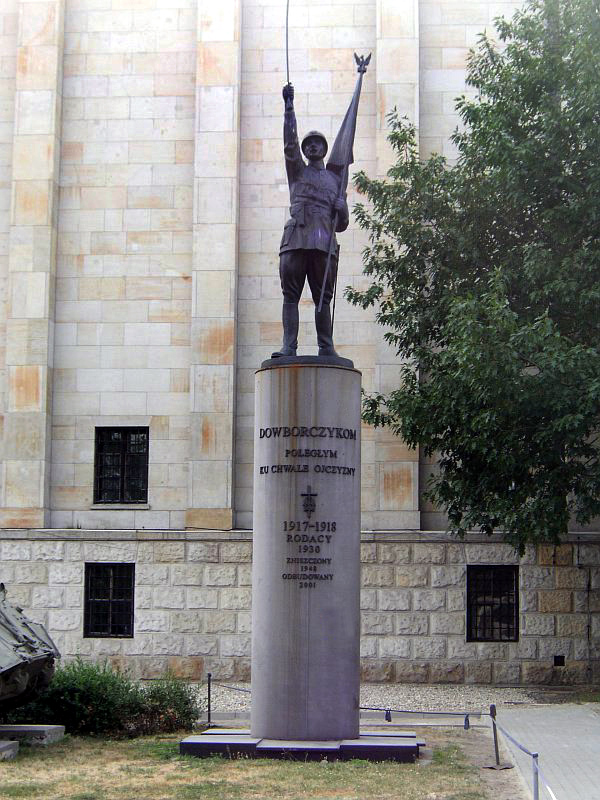
Monument to Dowbor-Muśnicki's men in Warsaw

On 25 January [O.S. 12 January] 1918, Dowbor-Muśnicki refused an order by the Soviet government to disband the Corps, which quickly led to clashes with the newly formed Red Army and Red Latvian riflemen under Jukums Vācietis. After sporadic fighting in late January, on January 31 Dowbor-Muśnicki's Corps had to retreat to Bobruisk and Slutsk, where he was surrounded by German forces. After the temporary breakdown of the Brest-Litovsk peace negotiations on February 10, Dowbor-Muśnicki joined the German offensive against the Bolsheviks on February 18 and took Minsk. After the signing of the Brest-Litovsk Peace Treaty, which gave all of Poland and Belarus to Germany, Dowbor-Muśnicki's corps remained in Belarus for 3 months, regrouping and performing police duties under German occupation authorities. In May 1918, Dowbor-Muśnicki was forced to sign an agreement with Germany that led to the disarmament and effective dissolution of the Corps by July 1918, at which point he moved to Poland. The agreement was criticized by some pro-independence Polish politicians, but it preserved the core of the Polish military, which proved decisive later that year.

== Against the Germans ==
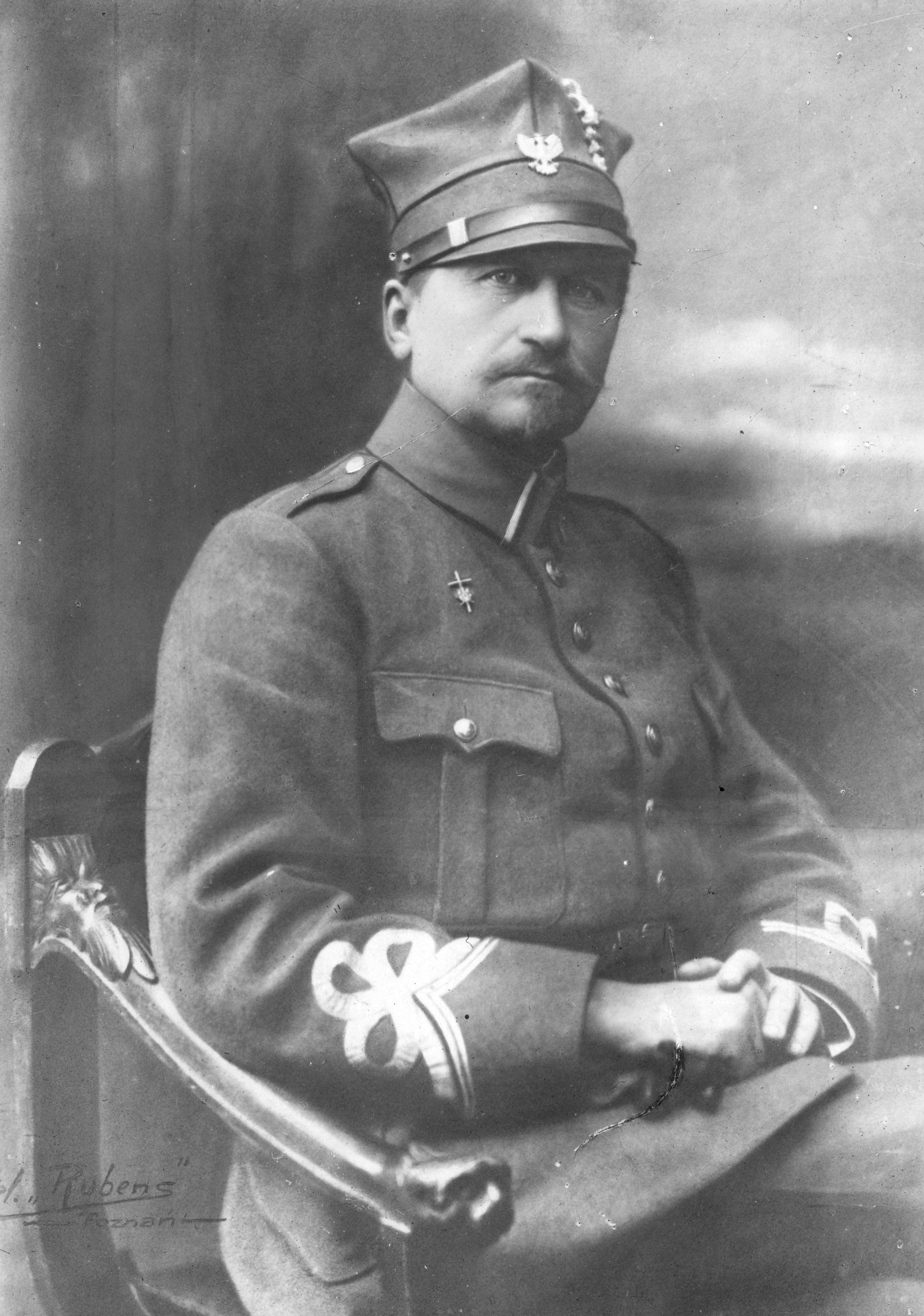
Józef Dowbor-Muśnicki c. 1919

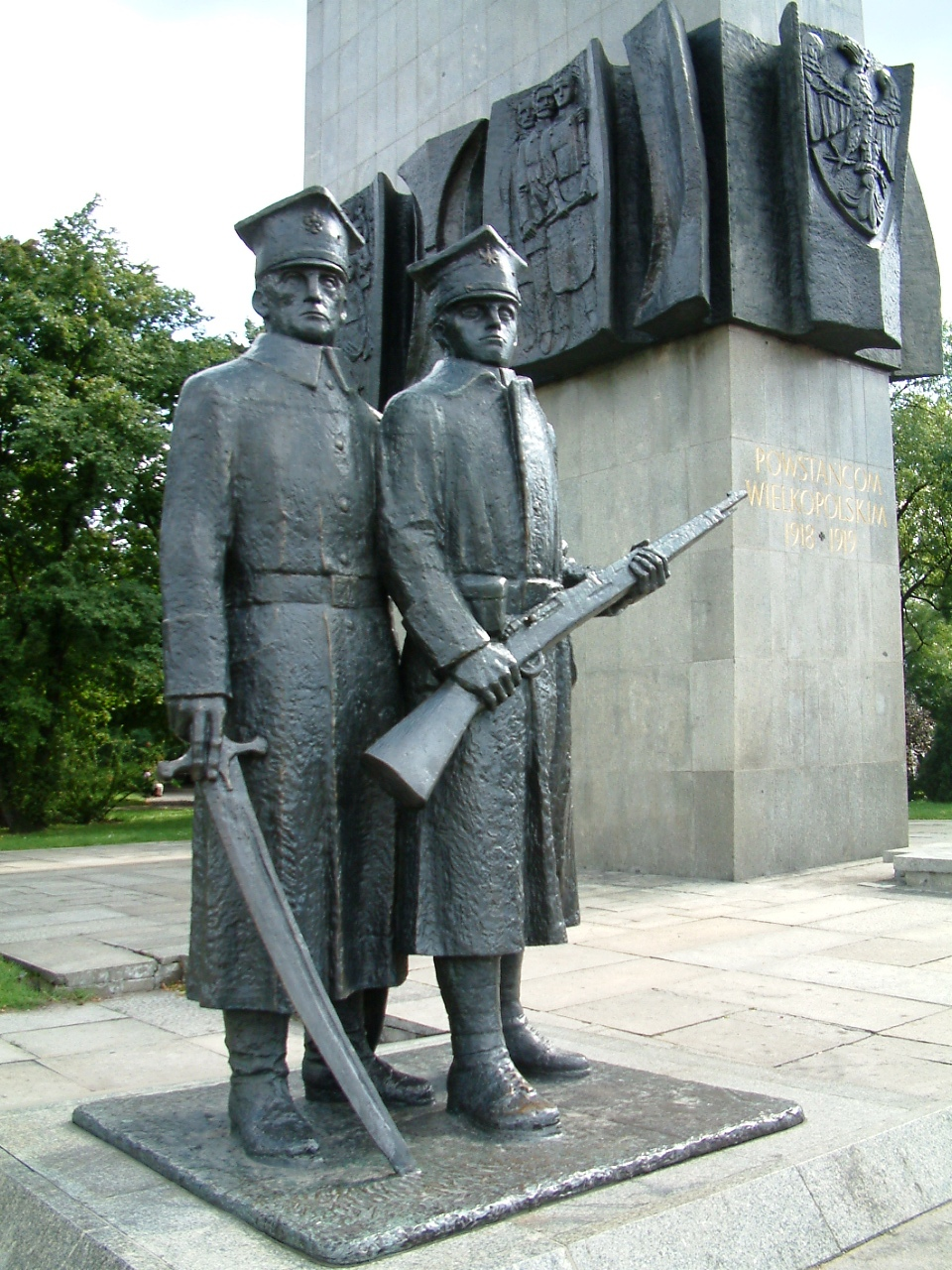
Part of monument of Polish insurgents of Greater Poland Uprising in Poznań

After the armistice that ended World War I in November 1918, Dowbor-Muśnicki helped organize a new Polish army around the disbanded 1st Corps and its officers. On 6 January 1919 he was nominated by the Supreme People's Council, the temporary ruling body of the province of Greater Poland, as the new commanding officer of all the Polish forces in the area. Two days later he arrived to Poznań and on January 16 he officially assumed his post, replacing Major Stanisław Taczak during the Greater Poland Uprising against Germany in the disputed region.

During his service as the commander in chief of the Uprising, Dowbor-Muśnicki was responsible for almost complete reorganization of what was started as a para-military partisan force. He introduced conscription and mobilized eleven classes of recruits and reformed the partisans into divisions. During his command, the Greater Polish Army grew from merely 20,000 to over 100,000 soldiers, well-armed and well-equipped. After the Battle of Ławica in which the Poles managed to capture the airfield, the Greater Polish Army was the fourth force in the world in number of aeroplanes available. Dowbor-Muśnicki focused also on political matters and strived for political neutrality of the forces under his command, which made him demobilize some of the leftist and rightist officers. He also disbanded the leftist soldiers' councils.

To some extent Dowbor-Muśnicki was conflicted with the Polish General Staff. Due to difficult diplomatic situation of Poland during the early stages of the Paris Peace Conference, the forces of the Greater Poland Uprising were separated from the Polish Army and were thought of as a separate entity. Because of that, he opposed drafting Poles from Greater Poland into the Polish Army and sending them to the fronts of the Polish-Ukrainian War and the Polish-Bolshevik War. Instead, he envisioned an offensive towards north which would spread the Uprising to the lands of Pomerania. However, after the area was peacefully transferred to Poland, his plans were made obsolete. Despite the conflict, on 19 March 1919 he was promoted to the rank of Generał broni, the highest rank of the Polish forces at that time. Finally, after the end of hostilities, on 19 October 1919 the Dowbor-Muśnicki's forces were merged with Józef Haller's Blue Army and the Polish Army while at the same time the lands of Greater Poland were officially incorporated into Poland.

== Retirement ==
Józef Dowbor-Muśnicki remained the commander of the so-called Greater Poland Front until the outbreak of the Polish-Bolshevik War, after which he resigned his post and applied to Józef Piłsudski for a new assignment. After General Stanisław Szeptycki declined to take the post of the commanding officer of the Ukrainian Front from General Wacław Iwaszkiewicz, the post was offered to Dowbor-Muśnicki, who refused. Having no further assignments, in March 1920 he resigned all his posts in the army and settled in Lusowo and then in Batorowo near Poznań. Opposing Piłsudski's Coup d'État of 1926, he did not rejoin the army during the internal struggle. Instead, he focused on writing his memoirs, Moje wspomnienia (My Memoirs). He suffered a heart attack on 26 October 1937 and was buried at the family tomb at the local cemetery.

== Family ==
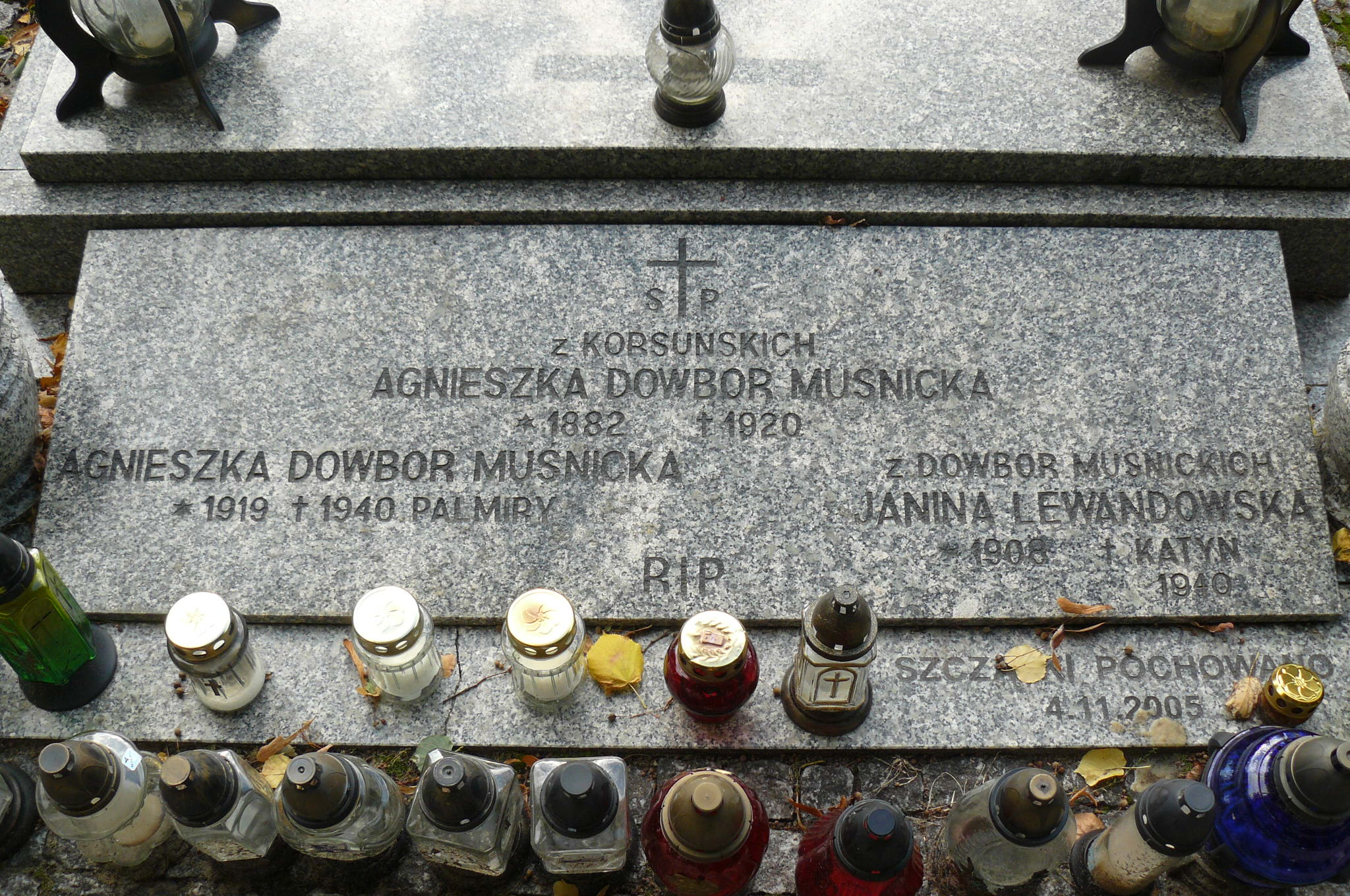
The grave stone commemorating Agnieszka Dowbor-Muśnicka and her sister Janina at the family tomb in Lusów cemetery.

Dowbor-Muśnicki had two sons, Giedymin and Olgierd, and two daughters, Janina and Agnieszka. Olgierd committed suicide before World War II, Giedymin emigrated to France in the 1930s, while both daughters were executed during World War II. Agnieszka, who was an active member of the Polish resistance, was arrested by the German occupiers, tortured in the Pawiak prison in Warsaw and then executed in the Palmiry mass murder site, while Janina Lewandowska was the only woman murdered by the Soviet NKVD during the Katyn massacre.

== Honors ==
- Order of St. Stanislaus 3rd degree with swords and bow, 1905
- Order of St. Anne 4th degree, 1905
- Order of St. Stanislaus 2nd degree with swords, 1905
- Order of St. Anne 3rd degree with swords and bow, 1905
- Order of St Vladimir 4th degree with swords and bow, 1906
- Order of St. Anne 2nd degree with swords, 1906
- Order of St Vladimir 3rd degree with swords and bow, 1913
- Order of St. George IV class (1915, Russian Empire)
- Order of St. George, 3rd class, 1915
- Golden Sword of St. George, 1915
- Order of St. Anne, First Class with Swords (1916, Russian Empire)
- Order of St. Stanislaus First Class with Swords (1916, Russian Empire)
- Order of the Crown of Italy, 3rd class (Italy)
- Order of the Bath, (Great Britain)
- Freedom Cross, 2nd Class (Estonia)
- War Cross, 2nd Class (Latvia)
- Order of the Double Dragon, 3rd class (China)
