= Wysogotowo =

- Village
- Location within Poland
- Coordinates: 52°24′N 16°46′E
- Country: Poland
- Voivodeship: Greater Poland
- County: Poznań
- Gmina: Tarnowo Podgórne
- Population: 412

Wysogotowo [vɨsɔɡɔˈtɔvɔ] is a village in the administrative district of Gmina Tarnowo Podgórne, within Poznań County, Greater Poland Voivodeship, in west-central Poland.
