= PBG SA =

PBG S.A.
- Company type: Public (WSE: PBG)
- Industry: Construction
- Founded: 1994
- Headquarters: Wysogotowo, Poland
- Area served: Central Europe, West Europe
- Key people: Jerzy Wiśniewski, (President)
- Total assets: €3.6 million
- Website: www.pbg-sa.pl

PBG SA is a Polish engineering company which is engaged in design, execution and repair of pipelines and equipment for the transport of oil, natural gas, water and waste water, infrastructure for heating and fuel storage facilities.

== See also ==
- List of petroleum companies
