= Batorowo, Poznań County =

Batorowo
- Village
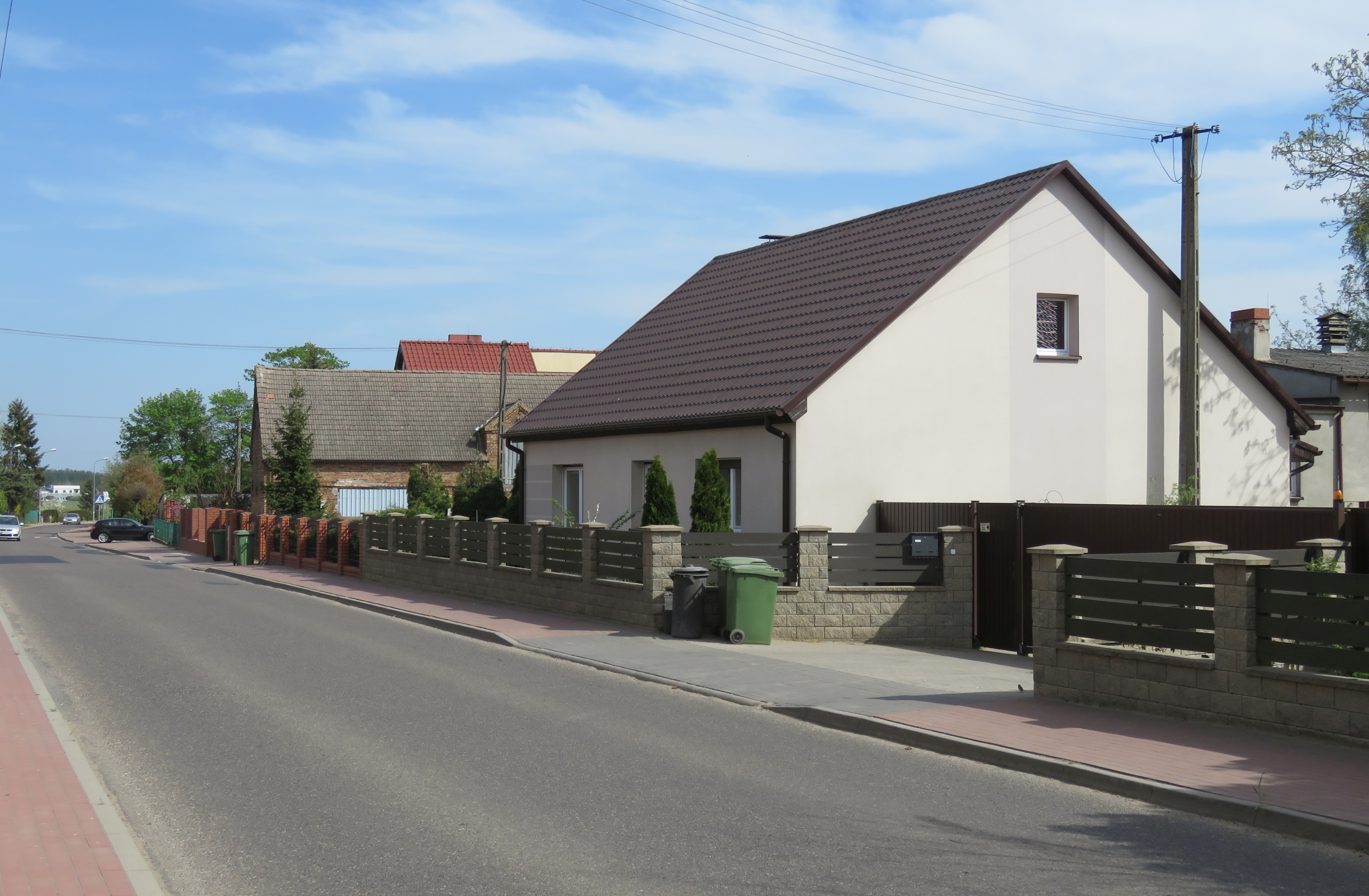

- Location within Poland
- Coordinates: 52°25′18″N 16°44′49″E
- Country: Poland
- Voivodeship: Greater Poland
- County: Poznań
- Gmina: Tarnowo Podgórne
- Population: 310

Batorowo [batɔˈrɔvɔ] is a village in the administrative district of Gmina Tarnowo Podgórne, within Poznań County, Greater Poland Voivodeship, in west-central Poland.
