= Przeźmierowo =

- Village
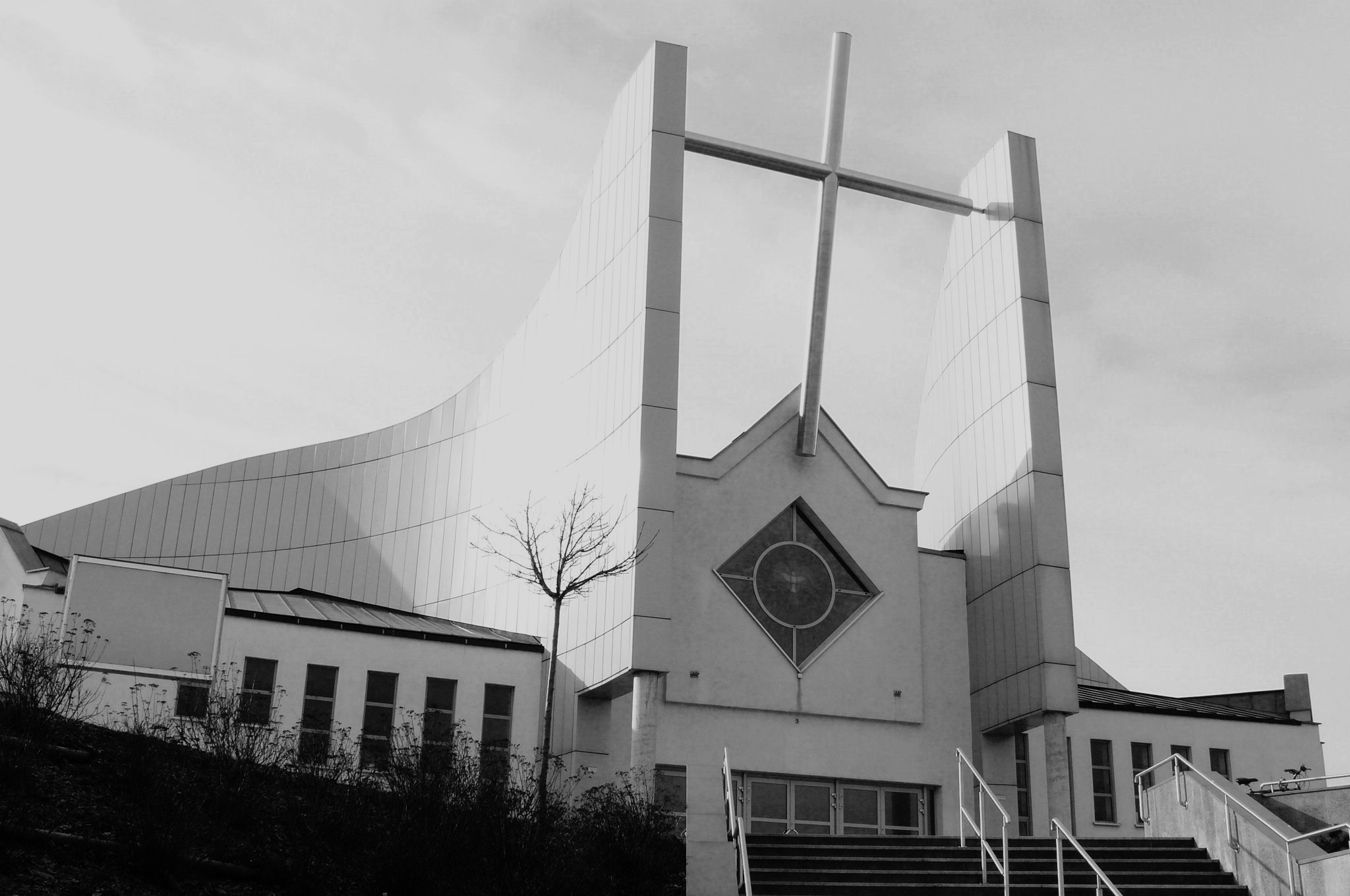
- Church of Saint Anthony of Padua

- Location within Poland
- Coordinates: 52°26′N 16°43′E
- Country: Poland
- Voivodeship: Greater Poland
- County: Poznań
- Gmina: Tarnowo Podgórne

Area
  - Total: 3,612 km^{2} (1,395 sq mi)

Population (2016)
  - Total: 6,455
  - Density: 1,810/km^{2} (4,700/sq mi)
- Time zone: GMT+1
- Postal code: 62-081

Przeźmierowo [pʂɛʑmjɛˈrɔvɔ] is a village in the administrative district of Gmina Tarnowo Podgórne, within Poznań County, Greater Poland Voivodeship, in west-central Poland.

The village has a population of 6455.
