= Agnieszka Dowbor-Muśnicka =

Polish resistance member

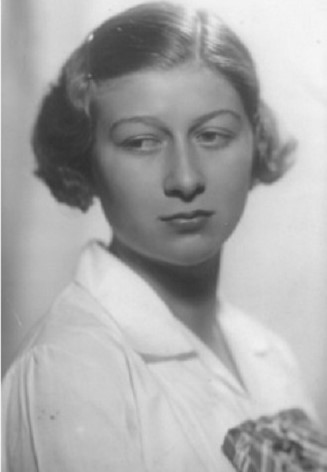
- Born: 7 September 1919; Lusowo, Poland
- Died: 20 or 21 June 1940; Palmiry, Poland
- Burial place: Lusów cemetery
- Occupation: Polish resistance member
- Father: Józef Dowbor-Muśnicki (1867–1937)

Agnieszka Dowbor-Muśnicka (7 September 1919 – 20 or 21 June 1940) was active in the Polish resistance against Nazi occupiers in World War II and was murdered in the Palmiry massacre.

== Life ==
Agnieszka (known by her friends as Gusia) was born on 7 September 1919 in Lusowo, Poland. Her father was Józef Dowbor-Muśnicki (1867–1937), a well-known Polish military general; her mother died when she was a very young child. With her sister and two brothers, she was taught at home and then attended local schools. She especially enjoyed looking after farm matters on the family estate so she decided to attend the State School of Horticulture in Poznań, Poland.

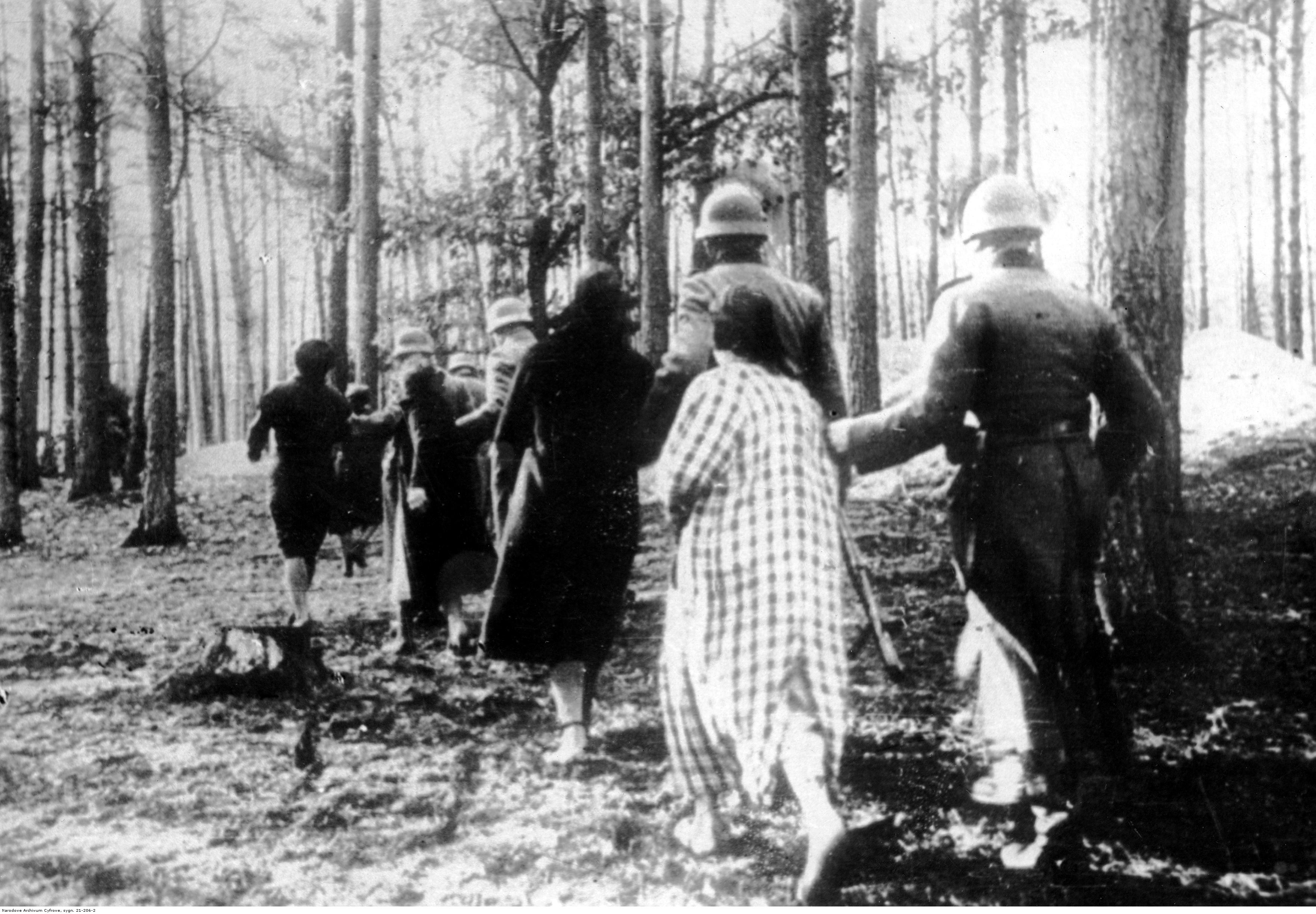
Polish women being led through the Palmiry forest for mass execution by Germans.

When she was 21, German forces occupied Poland and Agnieszka fled to Warsaw becoming an active member of the Polish resistance and joining an organization called "the Wolves." While underground, she used her nickname Gusia to hide her real identity because the Gestapo was already looking for her because she was the daughter of the famous general and member of the intelligentsia. At that time, all intellectuals were targeted by Nazi occupiers trying to murder anyone who could lead resistance efforts.

Agnieszka reported to the group leader, a former Polish Olympic athlete Janusz Kusociński, but she was arrested on 25 April 1940 and imprisoned in the Pawiak prison near Warsaw along with other activists of the Wolves center. She was tortured in the prison and then trucked to the Palmiry forest where the prisoners, including Kusociński, were murdered. Her body was thrown into a ditch several meters deep and lost for many years, but in 2017, her remains were unearthed and identified.

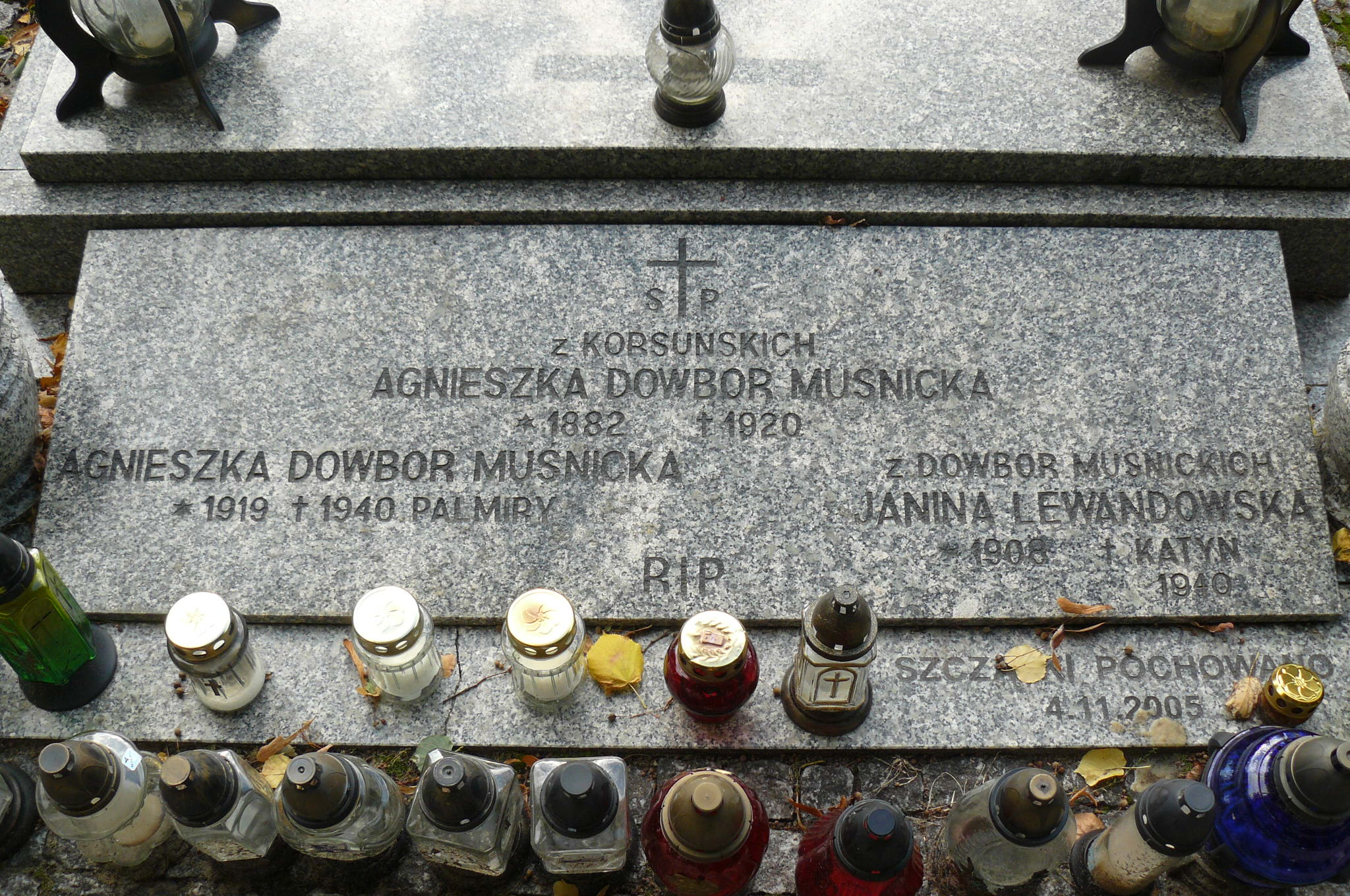
The grave stone commemorating Agnieszka Dowbor-Muśnicka and her sister Janina at the family tomb in Lusowo cemetery.

Agnieszka and her sister, Janina Lewandowska (1908-1940), are remembered together at the family tomb in Lusowo. Janina had served as a pilot and lieutenant in the Polish air corps and was murdered on her 32nd birthday during the Katyn massacre by forces of the Soviet Union.

== Commemorations ==
- At the base of a monument erected in 2015 to General Józef Dowbor-Muśnicki in Lusowo, both of his daughters are also remembered: "Janina Lewandowska, murdered in 1940 by the NKVD in Katyn, and Agnieszka Dowbor-Muśnicka, murdered by the Germans in Palmiry."
- On 19 March 2020, the National Bank of Poland introduced a commemorative silver coin with a face value of 10 zlotys. The coin, called "Katyń-Palmiry 1940," commemorates the two murdered sisters. On one side of the coin, Janina's image appears next to the word "Katyn." On the other side, a likeness of Agnieszka and the word "Palmiry" are featured with a quote that was engraved by a prisoner in a Warsaw cell:
  It is easy to talk about Poland. It's harder to work for her. It's even harder to die. And the hardest thing is to suffer.

== See also ==
- Janina Lewandowska (1908–1940)
