= Małachowo =

Małachowo may refer to the following places:

- Małachowo, Greater Poland Voivodeship (west-central Poland)
- Małachowo, Masovian Voivodeship (east-central Poland)
- Małachowo, Podlaskie Voivodeship (north-east Poland)
