= Palmiry massacre =

Mass executions carried out by Nazi Germany in Poland

Coordinates: 52.33°N 20.74°E

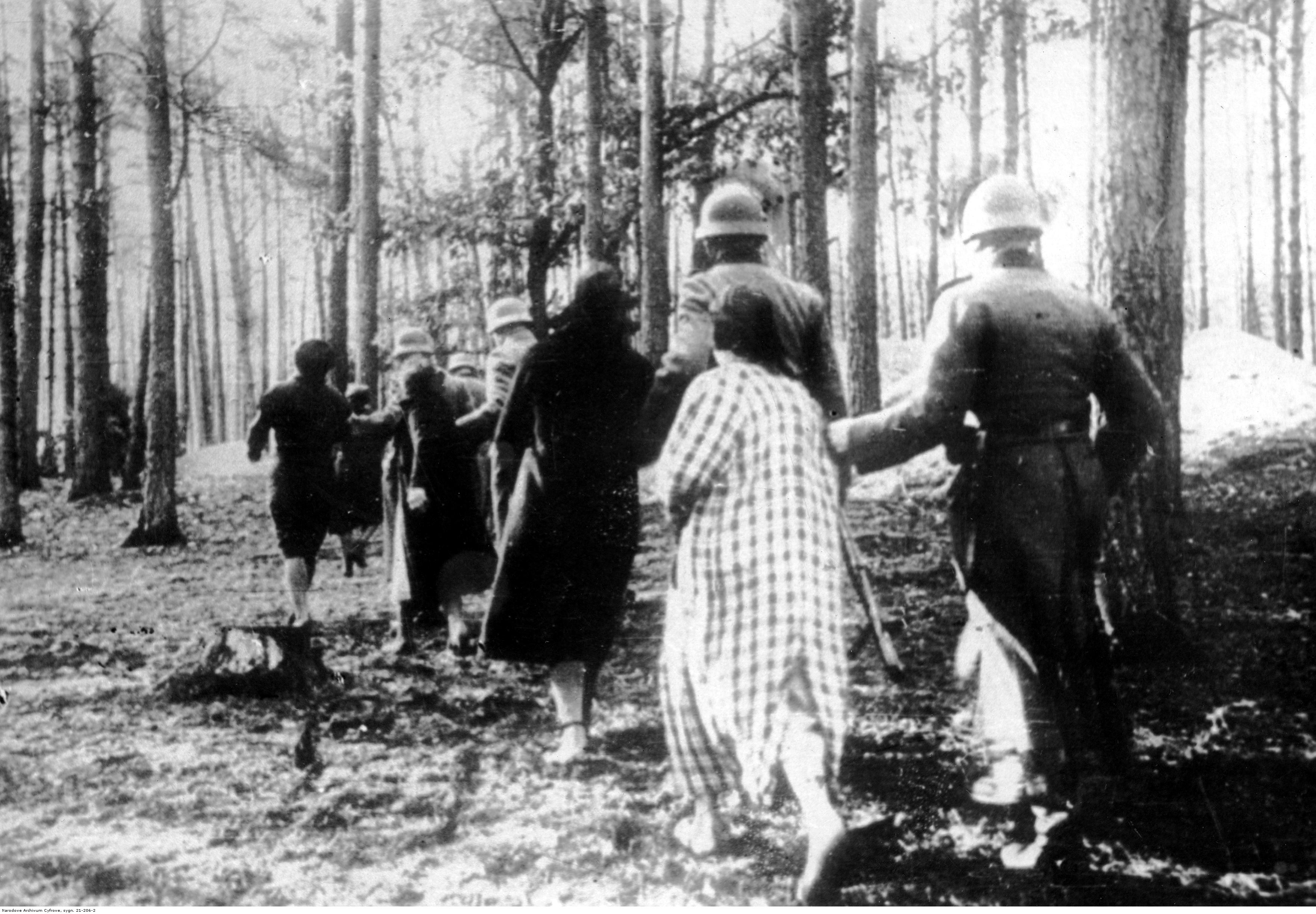
Polish women led to mass execution in a forest near Palmiry, 1940

The Palmiry massacre was a series of mass executions carried out by Nazi German forces, during World War II, near the village of Palmiry in the Kampinos Forest northwest of Warsaw.

== Massacres ==
Between December 1939 and July 1941 more than 1700 Poles and Jews – mostly inmates of Warsaw's Pawiak prison – were executed by the SS (Schutzstaffel) and Ordnungspolizei in a forest glade near Palmiry. The most well documented of these massacres took place on 20–21 June 1940, when 358 members of the Polish political, cultural, and social elite (Polish intelligentsia) were murdered in a single operation.

Palmiry is one of the most infamous sites of the Nazi crimes in Poland, and "one of the most notorious places of mass executions" in Poland. Along with the Katyn massacre, it has become emblematic of the martyrdom of Polish intelligentsia during World War II.

== Prelude ==
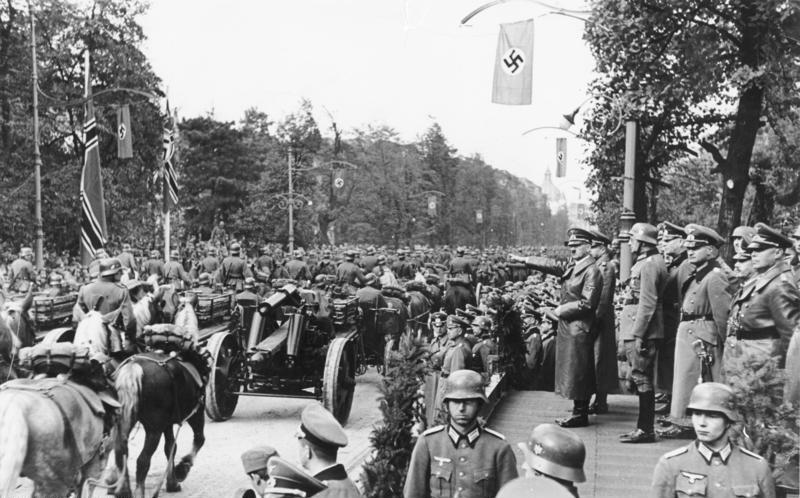
Adolf Hitler attends a Wehrmacht victory parade in Warsaw. 5 October 1939

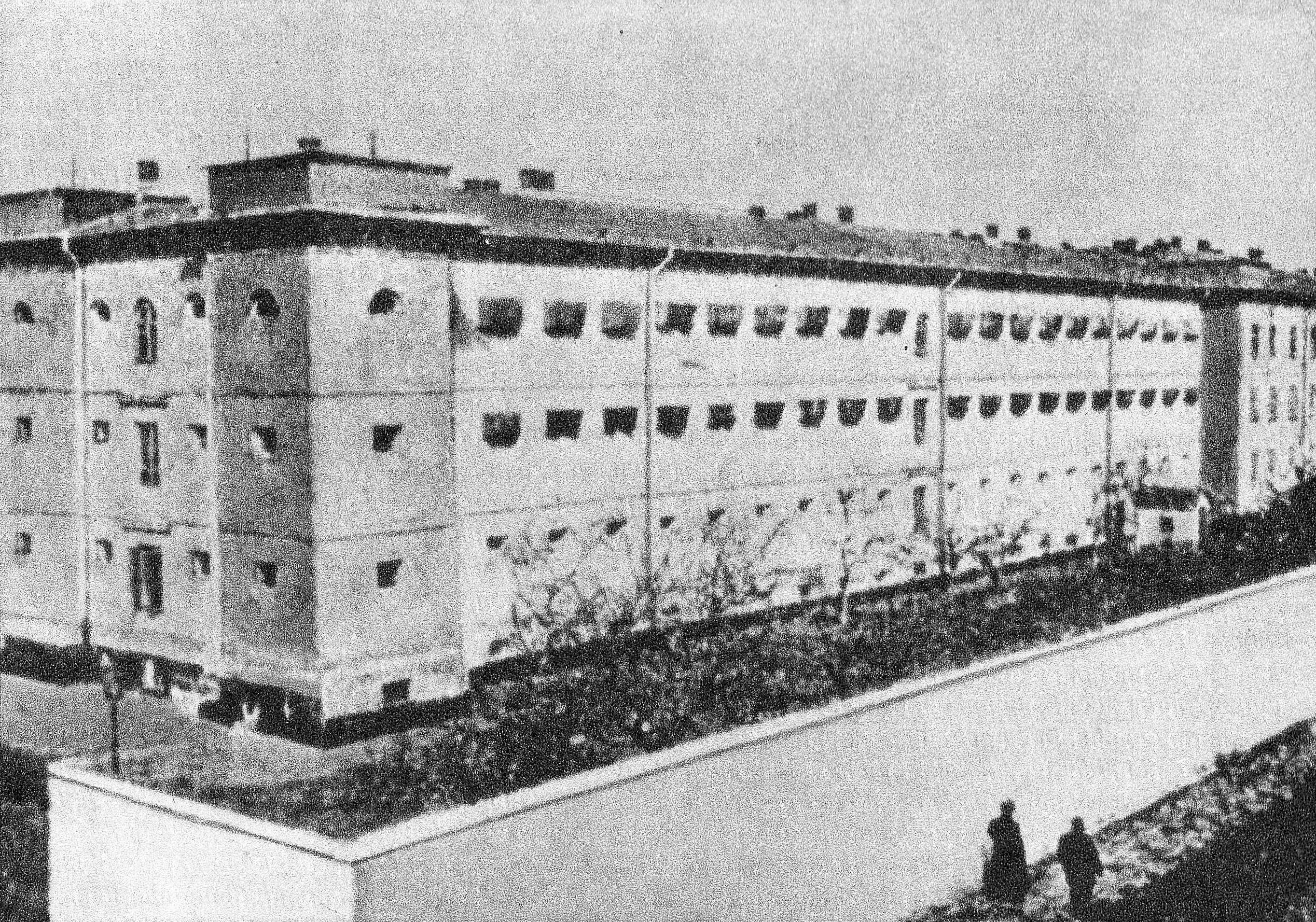
Pawiak prison in Warsaw

Warsaw was perceived by Nazi leaders as one of the biggest obstacles to their plan to subjugate the Polish nation. After the Nazi invasion of Poland, Warsaw was reduced to a provincial city in the newly created General Government. However, it remained a center of Polish cultural life. (Note: Before World War II about 40% of Polish university students and academic lecturers lived in Warsaw. There were more than 900 schools and colleges of various types, as well as about 200 museums, archives, libraries, theaters and cinemas. About half of all Polish newspapers and magazines were printed in Warsaw. See: Bartoszewski (1970), pp. 39–40.) Warsaw also headquartered the high command of the Polish Underground State and soon became a stronghold of armed and political resistance against the German occupation. On 14 December 1943 Governor-General Hans Frank noted in his diary:

There is a one place in this country which is a source of all our misfortunes – it is Warsaw. Without Warsaw we wouldn't have four-fifths of the troubles which we're facing now. Warsaw is the focus of all disturbances, the place from which discontent is spread through the whole country.

The Polish capital surrendered to the Wehrmacht armies on 28 September 1939. Three days later members of Einsatzgruppe IV led by SS-Brigadeführer Lothar Beutel entered the city. They immediately conducted a search in public and private buildings, as well as mass arrests. On 8 October 1939 about 354 Polish teachers and catholic priests were detained because occupational authorities assumed that they are “full of Polish chauvinism” and “created an enormous danger” for public order. Soon Warsaw's prisons and detention centers Pawiak, Mokotów Prison, the Central Detention Center at Daniłowiczowska Street, the cellars of the Gestapo headquarter on 25 Szucha Avenue were full of inmates. Many of the prisoners were deported to Nazi concentration camps. Many others were murdered.

In the first months of German occupation political prisoners from Warsaw were secretly executed in the back of the Polish parliament (Sejm) building complex at Wiejska Street (Note: After the beginning of German occupation, the Sejm buildings were converted into barracks for Ordnungspolizei units.) (in the so-called Sejm gardens, ogrody sejmowe). Between October 1939 and April 1940 several hundred people were murdered in this place. However Nazi German police authorities soon realized that they would not be able to keep executions secret if they were conducted in the very center of a large city. It was decided that henceforth mass executions would be carried out in the small forest glade in Kampinos Forest, located near the villages of Palmiry and Pociecha, about 30 kilometres (19 mi) northwest of Warsaw.

== Modus operandi ==
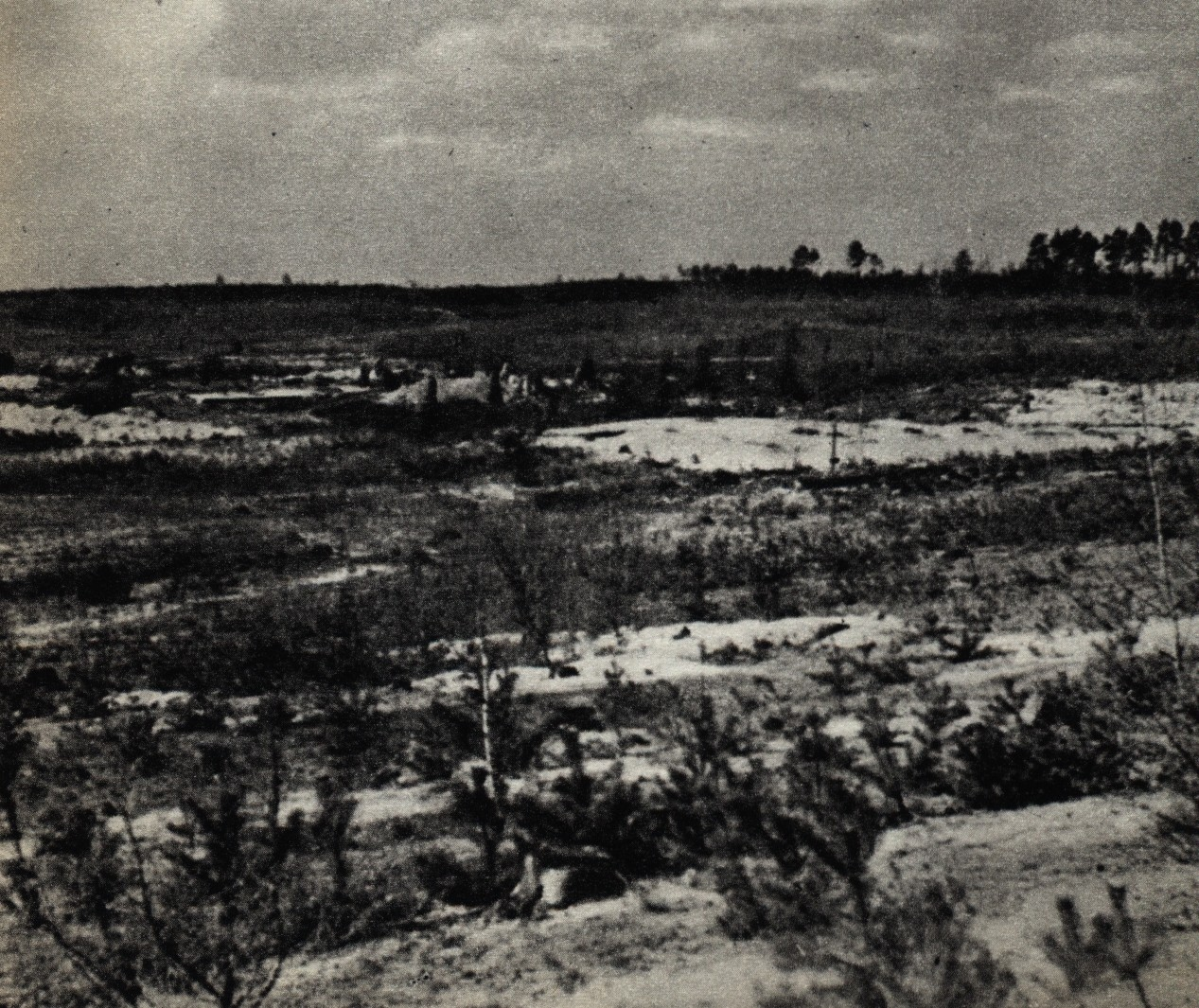
The "glade of death" near Palmiry. Postwar photo.

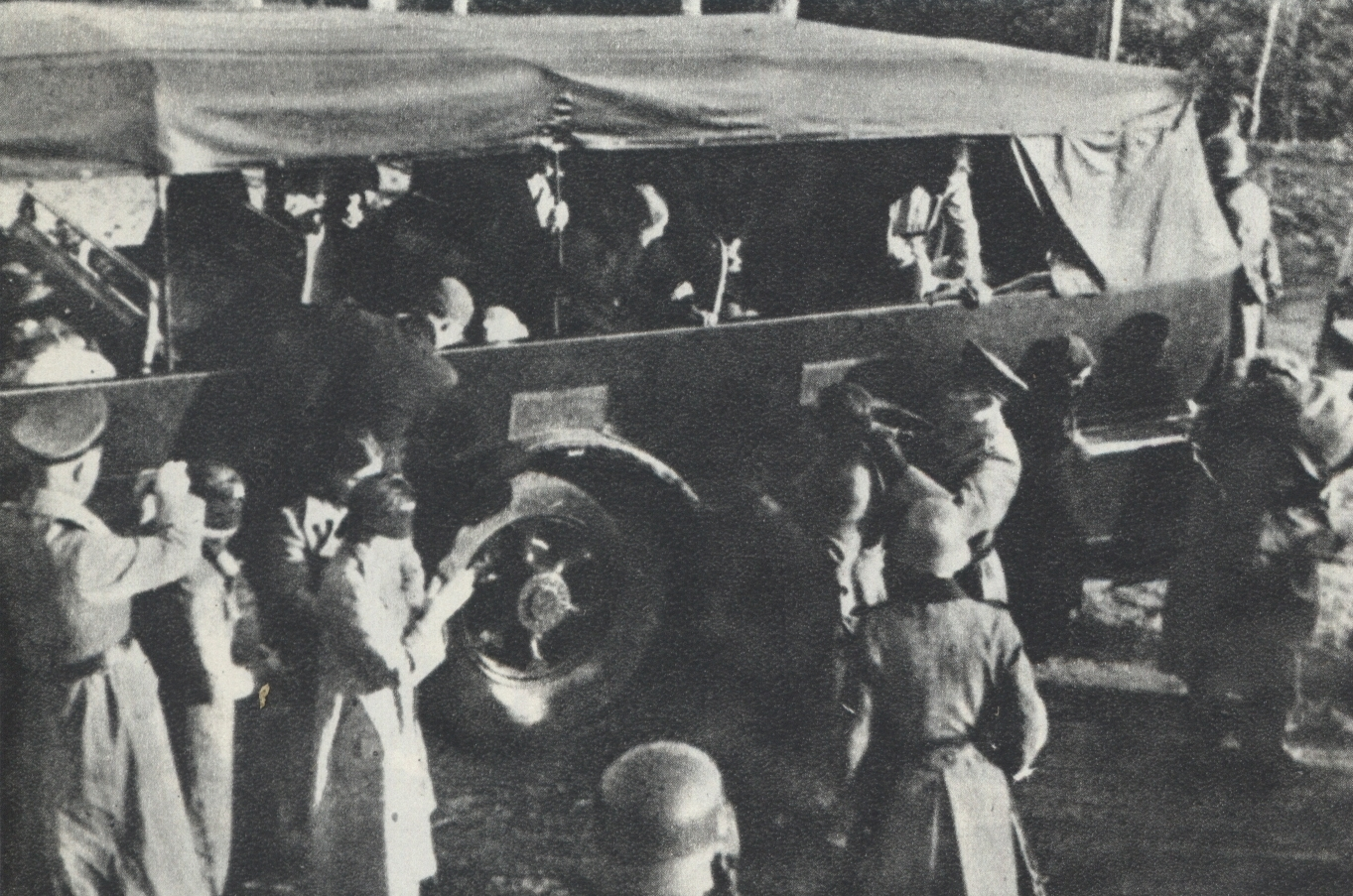
Palmiry; prisoners are blindfolded before execution

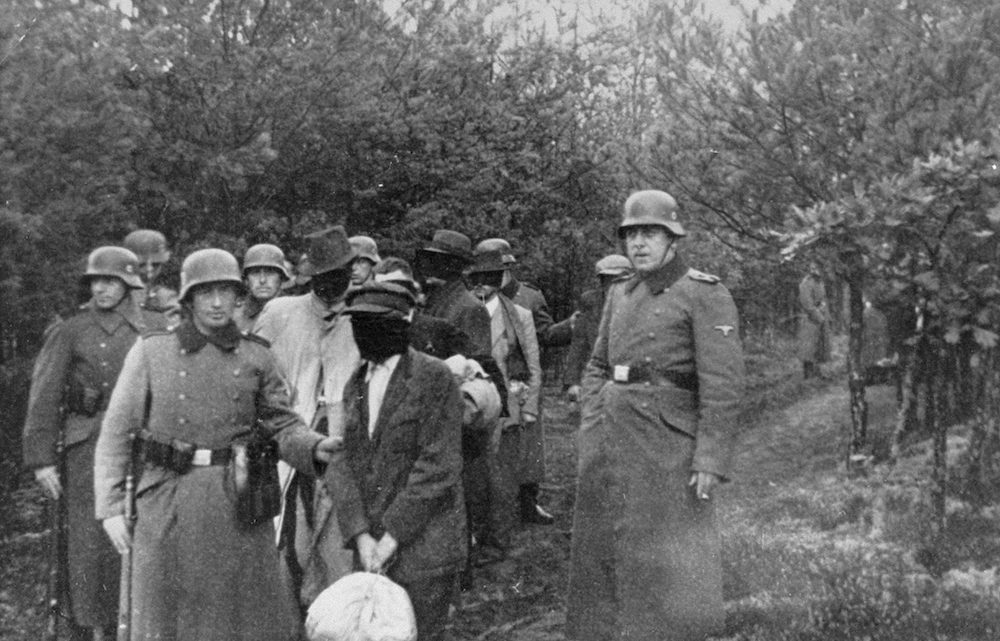
Victims and their executioners

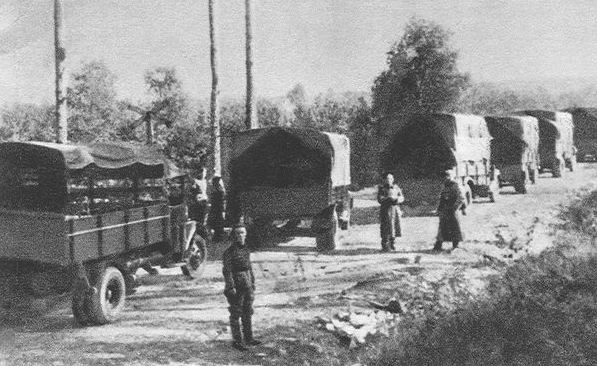
Death transport with empty trucks back to Warsaw after the execution in Palmiry

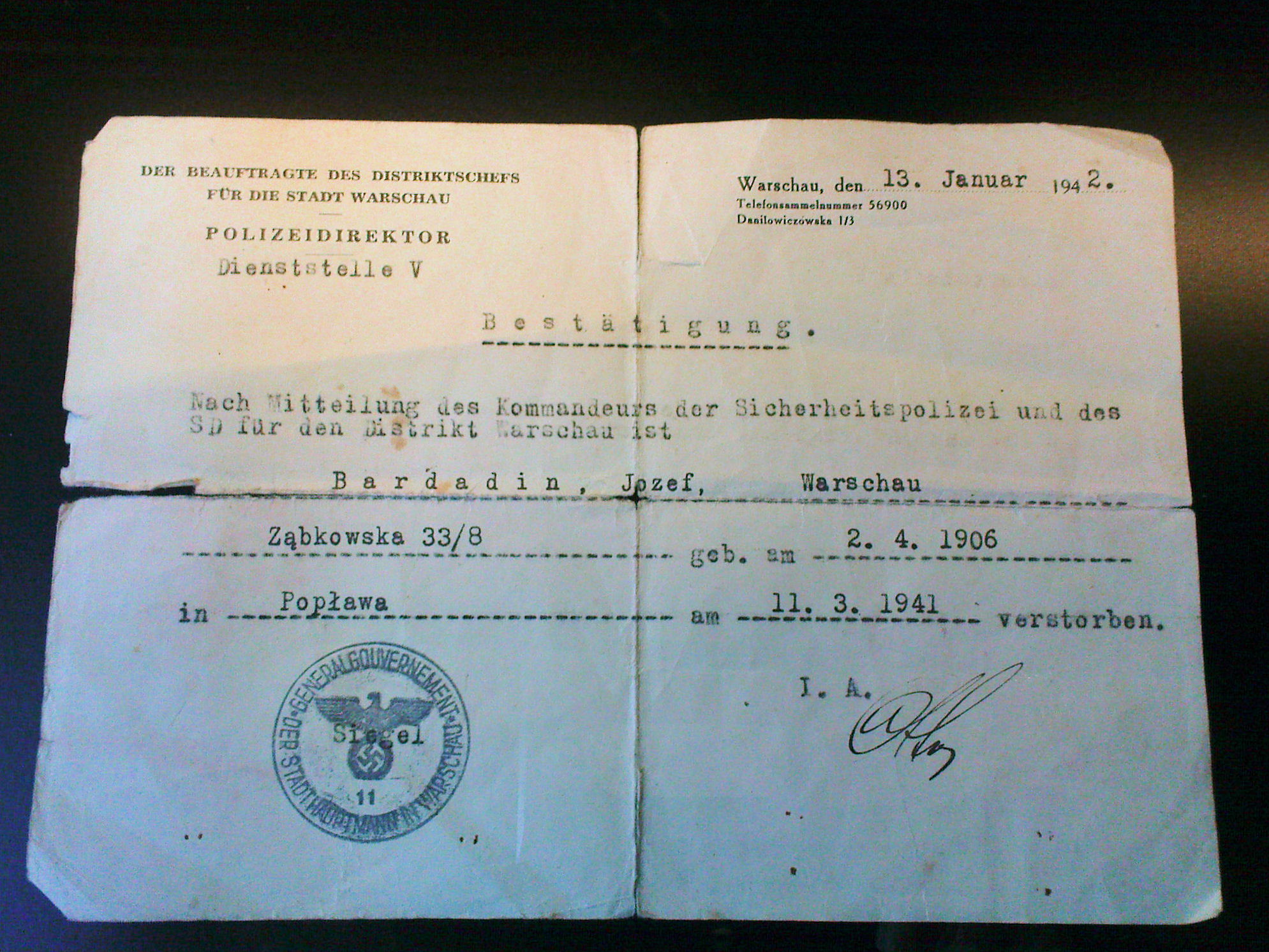
Official death notice sent by Nazi authorities to the family of one of the victims

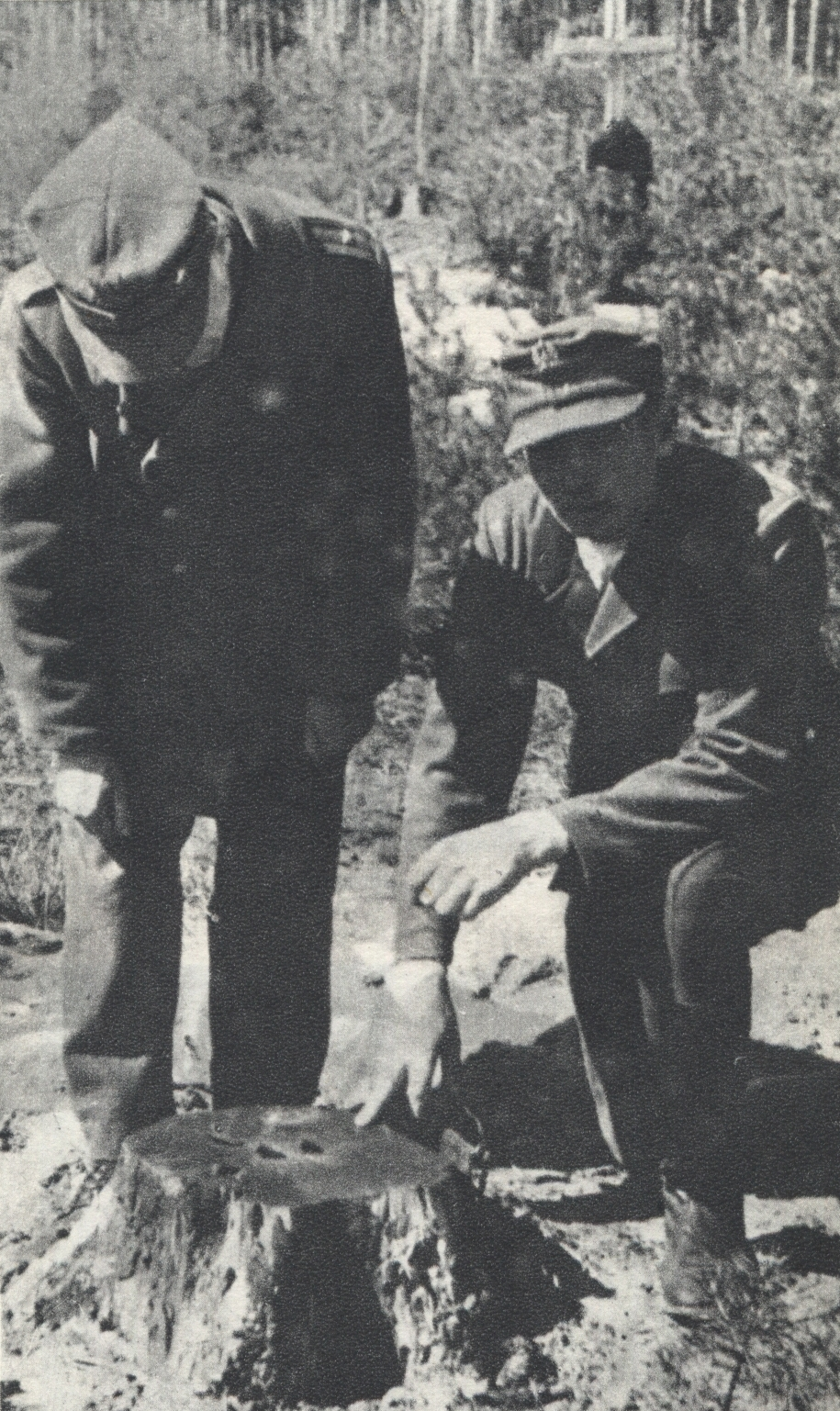
The forester Adam Herbański (right) with Stanisław Płoski, Chairman of the Commission for the Investigation of Nazi Crimes in Warsaw

Executions in Palmiry were carried out by the members of the Ordnungspolizei or by the soldiers of the regimental staff and the first squadron of the 1st SS Death's Head Cavalry Regiment (1. SS-Totenkopf-Reiterstandarte) which was quartered in Warsaw. They were overseen by Gestapo officers led by the SD and Sicherheitspolizei Commander in Warsaw, SS-Standartenführer Josef Meisinger.

In every case mass executions in Palmiry were prepared in a careful manner. Mass graves were always dug a few days before the planned execution. Usually it was done by the Arbeitsdienst unit which was quartered in Łomna or by Hitlerjugend members who camped near Palmiry. In most cases the graves were shaped like a ditch and were more than 30 metres (98 ft) long and 2.5–3 metres (8 ft 2 in – 9 ft 10 in) deep. Sometimes, for smaller groups of convicts or for individual victims, irregularly shaped graves were prepared, similar to natural terrain landslides or to explosion craters. The glade where executions took place was soon enlarged by tree-cutting. On the day of planned execution Polish forestry workers always received a day off. In the meantime German police undertook intensive patrolling near the glade and in the surrounding forest.

Victims were transported to the place of execution by trucks. Usually they were brought from Pawiak prison, rarely from Mokotów Prison. SS soldiers tried to convince their victims that they are going to transfer them to another prison or to a concentration camp. For this reason, death transports were usually formed at dusk and prisoners were allowed to take their belongings with them. Sometimes before departure convicts received an additional food ration and they were given back their documents from the prison's depository. Initially, these methods were so effective that the prisoners were not aware of the fate awaiting them. Later, when the truth about what was happening in Palmiry spread through Warsaw, some victims tried to throw short letters or small belongings from the trucks, in hopes that in this way they would be able to inform their families about their fate. During postwar exhumation some bodies were found with a card reading "Executed in Palmiry", written by the victims shortly before their death.

At the glade the prisoners' bags were taken but they were permitted to keep their documents and small belongings. Jews left on the yellow Star of David they were forced to wear as a badge under Nazi occupation; and people who worked in Pawiak's infirmary were found still wearing their badges with the Red Cross symbol. Sometimes prisoners' hands were tied and their eyes blindfolded. The victims were then taken to the edge of the grave and executed by machine gun fire. Sometimes victims were forced to hold a long pole or ladder behind their back. Such supports were later lowered so that the bodies fell into the grave in an even layer. Postwar exhumation proved that the wounded victims were sometimes buried alive. SS and OrPo members photographed the executions until it was forbidden by the SS-Standartenführer Meisinger, as happened on 3 May 1940. After the execution was finished, the graves were filled in, covered with moss and needles, and then planted over with young pine trees. Families of the victims were later informed by the Nazi authorities that their relatives had "died from natural causes".

Despite all efforts, the Nazis were not able to keep the massacres secret. Local Polish inhabitants, especially forestry workers and inhabitants of Palmiry and Pociecha, had many opportunities to observe the death transports and to hear the gunshots. Several times they also saw groups of prisoners being led to the place of execution. Forester Adam Herbański and his subordinates from the Polish Forest Service helped reveal the truth about the Palmiry massacre. At risk of their lives, they visited the forest glade after the executions (usually at night) in order to secretly mark out the mass graves. Also, a few photos taken by the executioners in Palmiry were stolen by members of the Union of Armed Struggle. (Note: Some of these photos were included in a brochure titled Totaler Terror. Polen am Marterpfahl ("Total terror. Poland at the torture stake"), which was published by the Polish Underground State in 1943. The brochure was written in German because German soldiers stationed in occupied Poland were its target.)

== Timeline of the Palmiry massacre ==
=== First executions ===
Probably the first executions in the forest glade near Palmiry were carried out on 7 and 8 December 1939, when 70 and 80 people were murdered, respectively. According to the Wehrmacht soldiers who guarded a nearby ammunition warehouse, all the victims were Jewish.

The next execution was conducted on 14 December 1939 when 46 people were shot dead. At least some of the victims came from Pruszków. Among them were Stanisław Kalbarczyk, a Polish teacher from Pruszków, and two unidentified women.

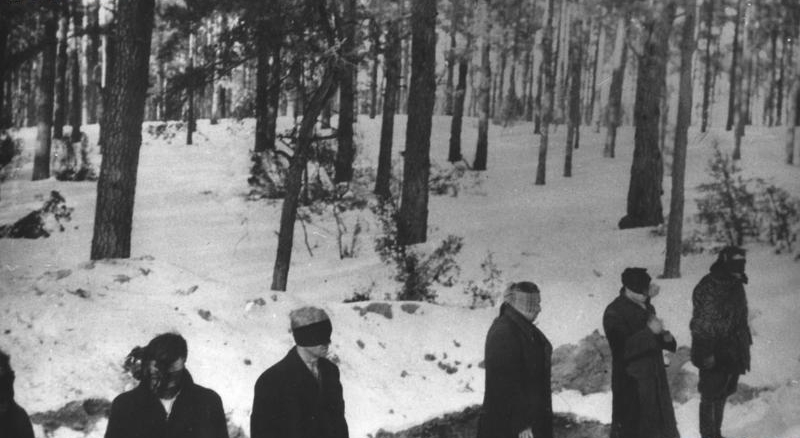
Mass execution in Palmiry

The circumstances of the last mass execution conducted in Palmiry in 1939 are at least partially known. However, according to Maria Wardzyńska (a Polish historian employed in the Institute of National Remembrance), at least 70 other people were secretly executed in Palmiry before the end of 1939.

In January and February 1940 the Gestapo infiltrated and crushed the underground organization Polska Ludowa Akcja Niepodległościowa (PLAN) ("Polish People's Independence Action"). On 14 January, the PLAN commander, Kazimierz Andrzej Kott, escaped from the Gestapo headquarters at 25 Szucha Avenue. Soon after, several hundred people were arrested in Warsaw, among them 255 leading Jewish intellectuals. On 21 January about 80 hostages, including two women, were executed in Palmiry. Among the victims were Fr. Marceli Nowakowski (rector of the Church of the Holiest Saviour in Warsaw, and former member of parliament) and 36 Jews (including attorney Ludwik Dyzenhaus, dentist Franciszek Sturm and chess master Dawid Przepiórka). Another 118 people arrested after Kott's escape, mostly Jews, were probably murdered in Palmiry in the first months of 1940.

According to Maria Wardzyńska, about 40 inhabitants of Zakroczym were also executed in Palmiry in January 1940. Among them was the mayor of Zakroczym, Tadeusz Henzlich.

The next mass execution in Palmiry was carried out on 26 February 1940. In retaliation for the death of the German mayor of Legionowo, who had been assassinated two days earlier by unknown perpetrators, about 190 people were murdered at the "glade of death". Among the victims were six women. In most cases the victims of this execution came from Legionowo or from surrounding localities.

On the night of 28 March 1940, German police officers entered the house at Sosnowa Street in Warsaw where Józef Bruckner, commander of the underground organization Wilki ("The Wolves"), had his conspiratorial flat. Bruckner and his aide opened fire on the policemen, and after a brief fight, they escaped from the building. In retaliation, the Germans arrested 34 Polish men who lived in this building (aged 17 to 60). All of them were murdered in Palmiry on 23 April 1940.

On 2 April 1940, about 100 inmates of Pawiak and Mokotów prisons were murdered in Palmiry. The execution was conducted in retaliation for the assassination of two German soldiers in Warsaw. Among the victims were Fr. Jan Krawczyk (theologian, parson of Catholic parish in Wilanów), Bogumił Marzec (attorney), Stefan Napierski (literary critic, editor of monthly magazine of literature Ateneum), Bohdan Offenberg (deputy director of the Labour Fund), Zbigniew Rawicz-Twaróg (captain of the Polish Army), Jacek Szwemin (architect), and 27 women.

According to Polish historians, between 700 and 900 people were executed in Palmiry from December 1939 until April 1940.

=== AB-Aktion ===
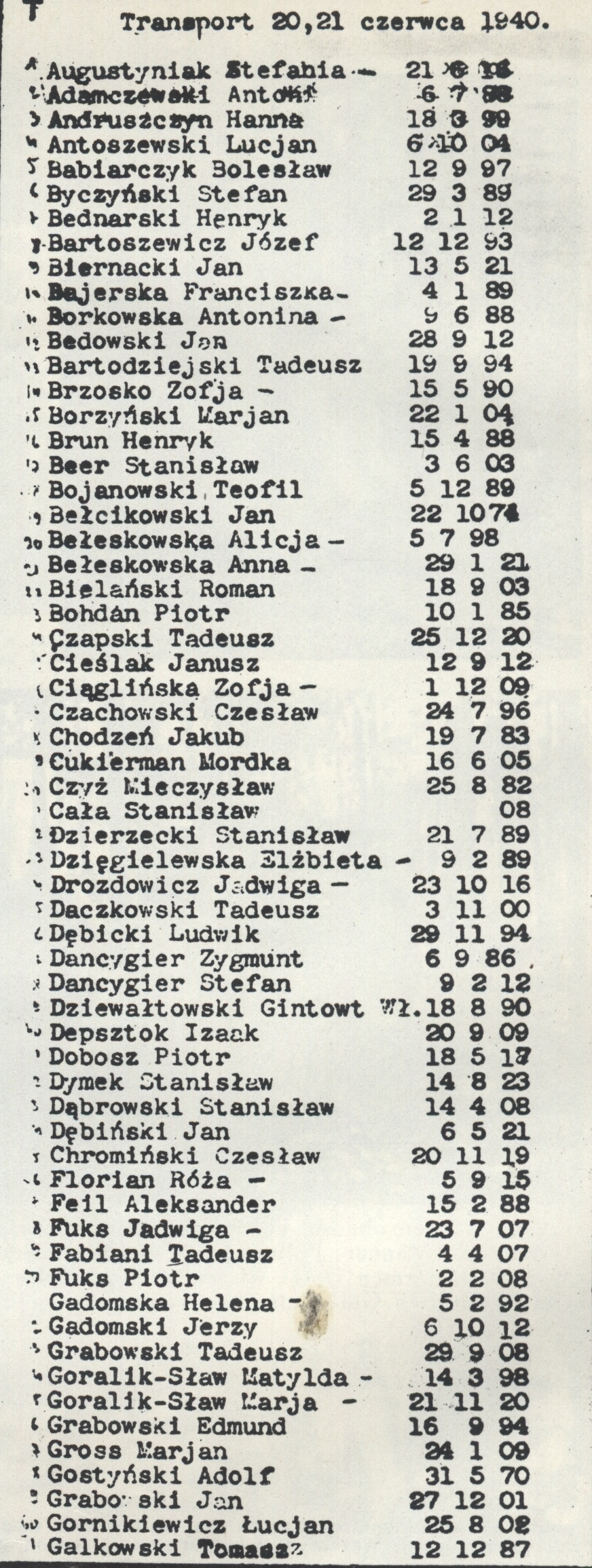
Secret list smuggled from Pawiak by the Polish female guard Janina Gruszkowa (member of the Polish resistance). It contains some of the names of Polish political prisoners who were executed in Palmiry on 20–21 June 1940

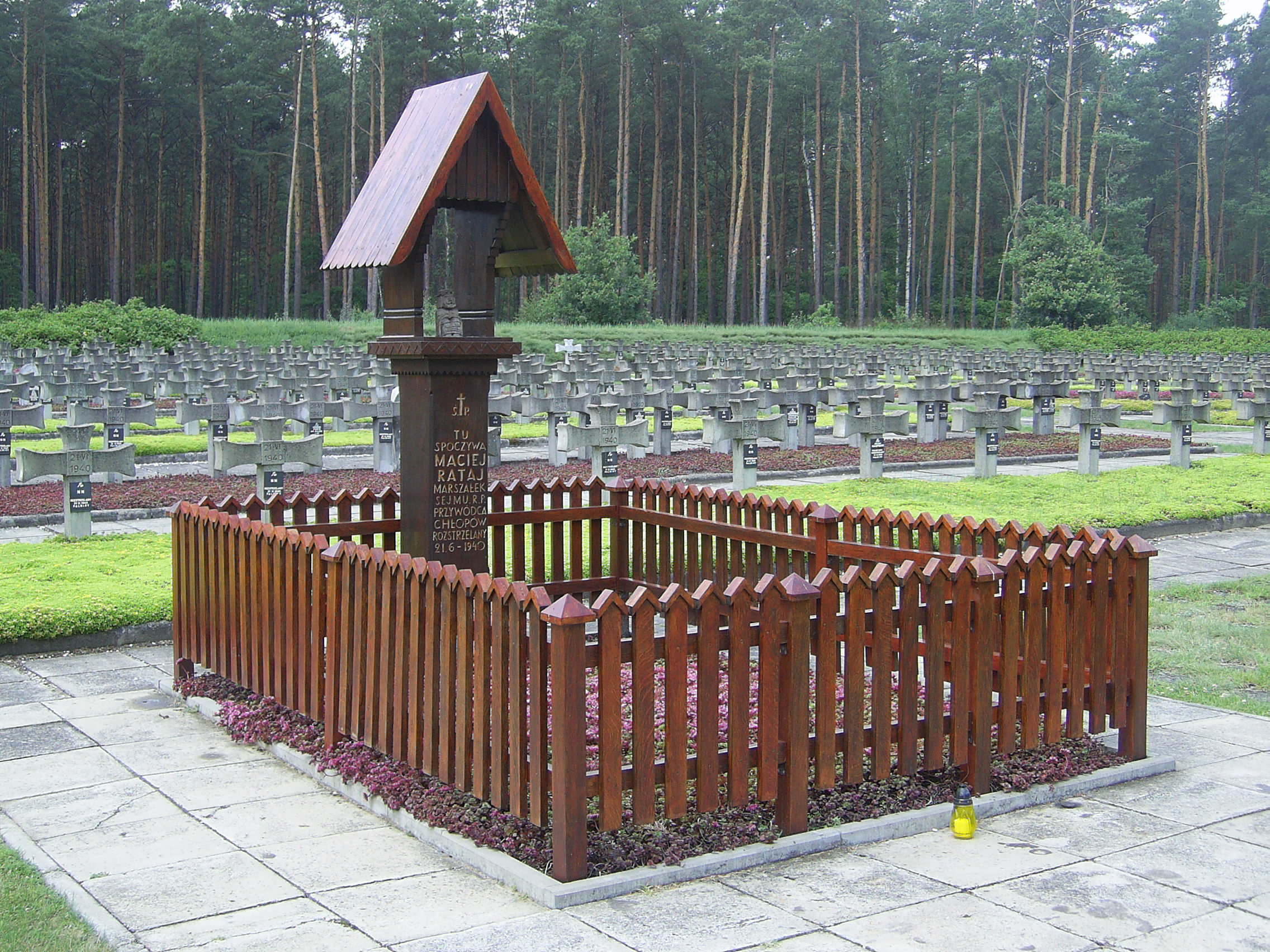
Grave of Maciej Rataj at the cemetery in Palmiry

In the spring of 1940, the highest NSDAP and SS authorities in the General Government decided to conduct a wide-ranging police operation aimed at the extermination of the Polish political, cultural, and social elite. The mass murder of Polish politicians, intellectuals, artists, social activists, as well as people suspected of potential anti-Nazi activity, was seen as a preemptive measure to keep the Polish resistance scattered and to prevent the Poles from revolting during the planned German invasion of France. This operation was given the code name AB-Aktion (shortcut from Außerordentliche Befriedungsaktion (Note: English: "Extraordinary Operation of Pacification".)). It officially lasted from May to July 1940 and claimed at least 6500 lives.

At the end of March 1940, Warsaw and surrounding cities were hit by a wave of arrests. During the next two months, hundreds of Polish intellectuals and prewar politicians were detained and imprisoned in Pawiak. On 20 April, the Gestapo arrested 42 Polish attorneys in the building of Warsaw's Chamber of Attorneys. On 10 May, occupants detained over a dozen Polish school headmasters who, despite the German interdict, had closed their school on 3 May Constitution Day. The frequency and number of executions in Palmiry increased with the beginning of AB-Aktion.

The first mass execution conducted in Palmiry in the course of AB-Aktion took place on 14 June 1940. About 20 people were murdered on that day, among them Polish historian Karol Drewnowski and his son Andrzej.

The best-documented massacre took place on 20–21 June 1940 when three transports with 358 inmates were sent from Pawiak to the place of execution near Palmiry. Among the victims were:

- Maciej Rataj (politician, former Marshal of the Sejm and former acting President of Poland)
- Mieczysław Niedziałkowski (politician of the Polish Socialist Party)
- Jan Pohoski (prewar deputy president of Warsaw)
- Ludomir Skórewicz (prewar starosta of Warsaw powiat)
- Halina Jaroszewiczowa (politician, former member of parliament)
- Henryk Brun (industrialist, former member of parliament, chairman of the Polish Merchants Association)
- Janusz Kusociński (athlete, winner of the 10,000 m race at the 1932 Summer Olympics)
- Feliks Zuber (athlete, deputy president of "Warszawianka" sport club)
- Tomasz Stankiewicz (track cyclist who competed in the 1924 Summer Olympics)
- Jan Wajzer (doctor of law, secretary general of the Polish Union in Free City of Danzig)
- Stefan Kwiatkowski (deputy chairman of the Association of teachers of secondary and third degree schools)
- Władysław Dziewałtowski-Gintowt, Tadeusz Fabiani, Edmund Grabowski, Czesław Marian Jankowski, Stanisław Jezierski, Józef Krasuski, Jerzy Niżałowski, Józef Starzewski, Wacław Tyrchowski (attorneys)
- Stanisław Beer, Jadwiga Fuks, Maria Witkowska (painters);
- Helena Łopuszańska (actress)
- Agnieszka Dowbor-Muśnicka (activist and daughter of General Józef Dowbor-Muśnicki)
- Alicja Bełcikowska, Jan Bełcikowski, Grzegorz Krzeczkowski, Wojciech Kwasieborski, Tadeusz Lipkowski, Jan Werner (writers and publicists)

=== Last executions ===
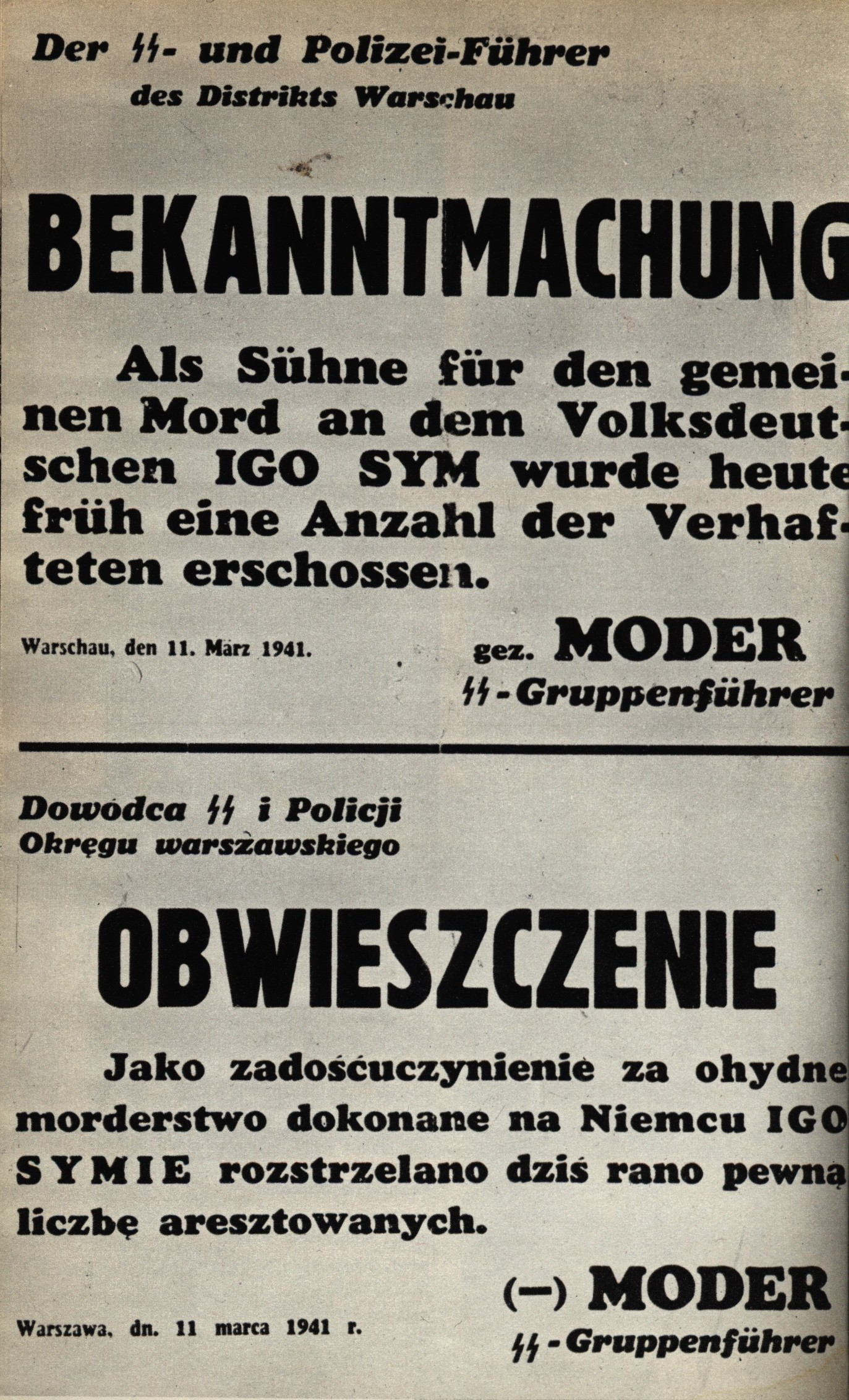
SS-Gruppenführer Paul Moder announcement of execution of “a number of Poles” in retaliation of death of Igo Sym

On 23 July 1940, Governor-General Hans Frank officially announced the end of AB-Aktion. Despite that, massacres in Palmiry continued for over a year. On 30 August 1940, at least 87 persons were executed at the forest glade. Among the victims were a number of people who were arrested in Włochy three months earlier.

Another mass execution was carried out on 17 September 1940 when about 200 prisoners of Pawiak, including 20 women, were murdered at the forest glade near Palmiry. Among the victims were: Tadeusz Panek and Zbigniew Wróblewski (attorneys), Fr. Zygmunt Sajna (parson of Catholic parish in Góra Kalwaria), Jadwiga Bogdziewicz and Jan Borski (journalists) and Władysław Szopinski. According to Regina Domańska, this massacre might be connected with the uncovering of an underground printing house at Lwowska Street in Warsaw.

This was the last execution conducted in Palmiry in 1940 for which circumstances are at least partially known. However, during the postwar exhumation, three mass graves filled with 74, 28, and 24 corpses respectively, were found at the forest glade. It is certain that first two of them were filled and buried in the winter of 1940, while the third one was probably dug in the winter of 1940 or 1939. Polish historians were not able to determine the circumstances of those massacres. According to Regina Domańska, about 27 prisoners of Pawiak were executed in Palmiry on 4 December 1940. According to Maria Wardzyńska, up to 260 people could have been murdered in Palmiry in the winter of 1940.

On 7 March 1941, actor Igo Sym, well-known Nazi collaborator and Gestapo agent, was assassinated by the soldiers of the Union of Armed Struggle. In retaliation, 21 Pawiak prisoners were executed in Palmiry four days later. Among the victims were Stefan Kopeć (biologist, professor at the University of Warsaw) and Kazimierz Zakrzewski (historian, professor at the University of Warsaw).

On 1 April 1941 about 20 men from Łowicz were executed in Palmiry. Among the victims was deputy mayor of Łowicz, Adolf Kutkowski.

Another massacre was conducted on 12 June 1941 when 30 prisoners of Pawiak, including 14 women, were murdered in Palmiry. Among the victims were: Witold Hulewicz (poet and radio journalist), Stanisław Piasecki (right-wing politician and literary critic), Jerzy Szurig (lawyer, syndicalist), Stanisław Malinowski (attorney).

The last known mass execution in Palmiry was carried out on 17 July 1941 when 47 people, mostly prisoners of Pawiak, were murdered in the forest glade. Among the victims were Zygmunt Dymek (journalist and labor activist) and six women.

After 17 July 1941, German authorities ceased using the forest glade in Palmiry as a place of mass executions. The reason probably was that they realized the Polish resistance and the civilian population were well aware of what was happening in Palmiry.

== Remembrance ==
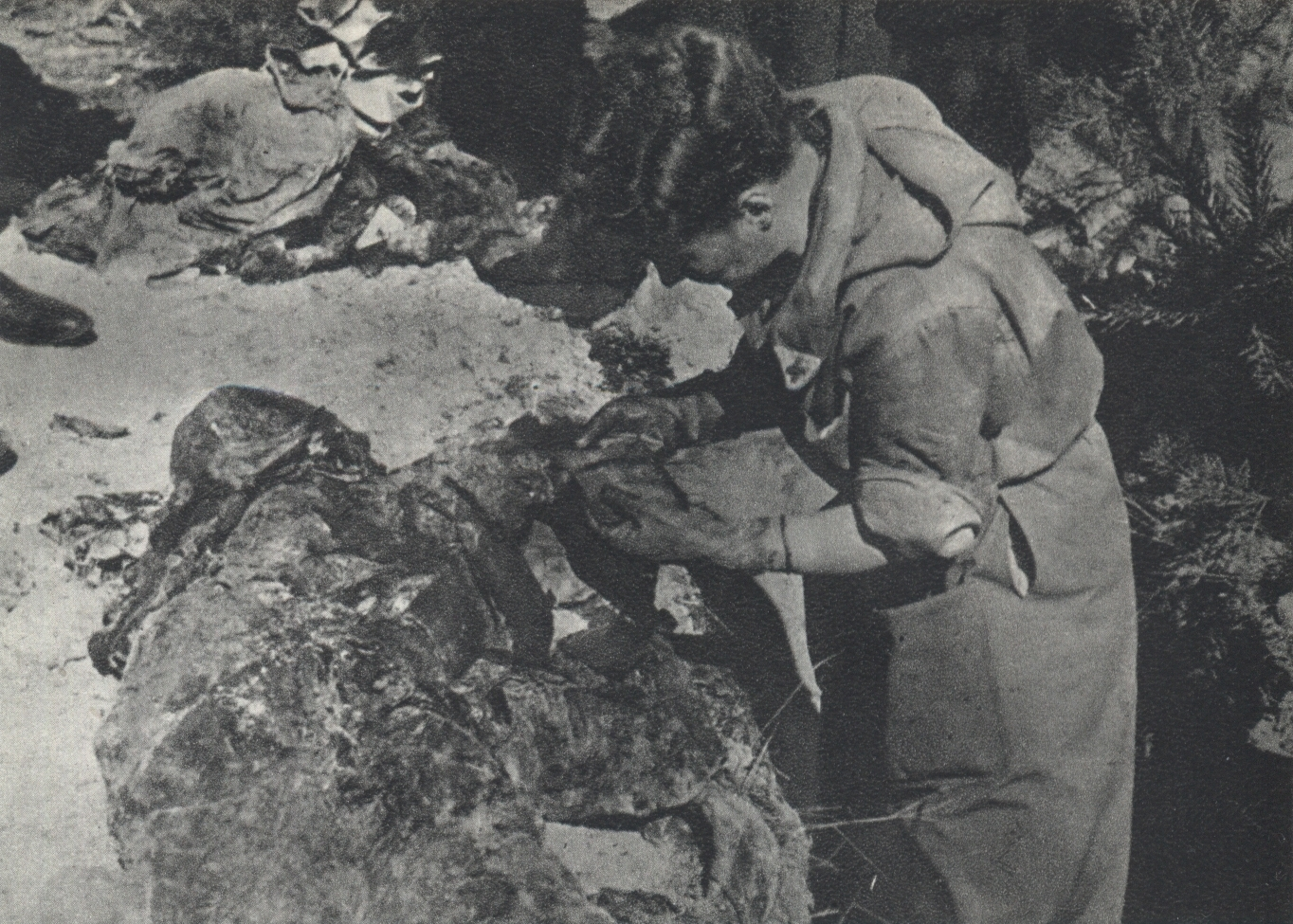
Exhumation in Palmiry in 1946

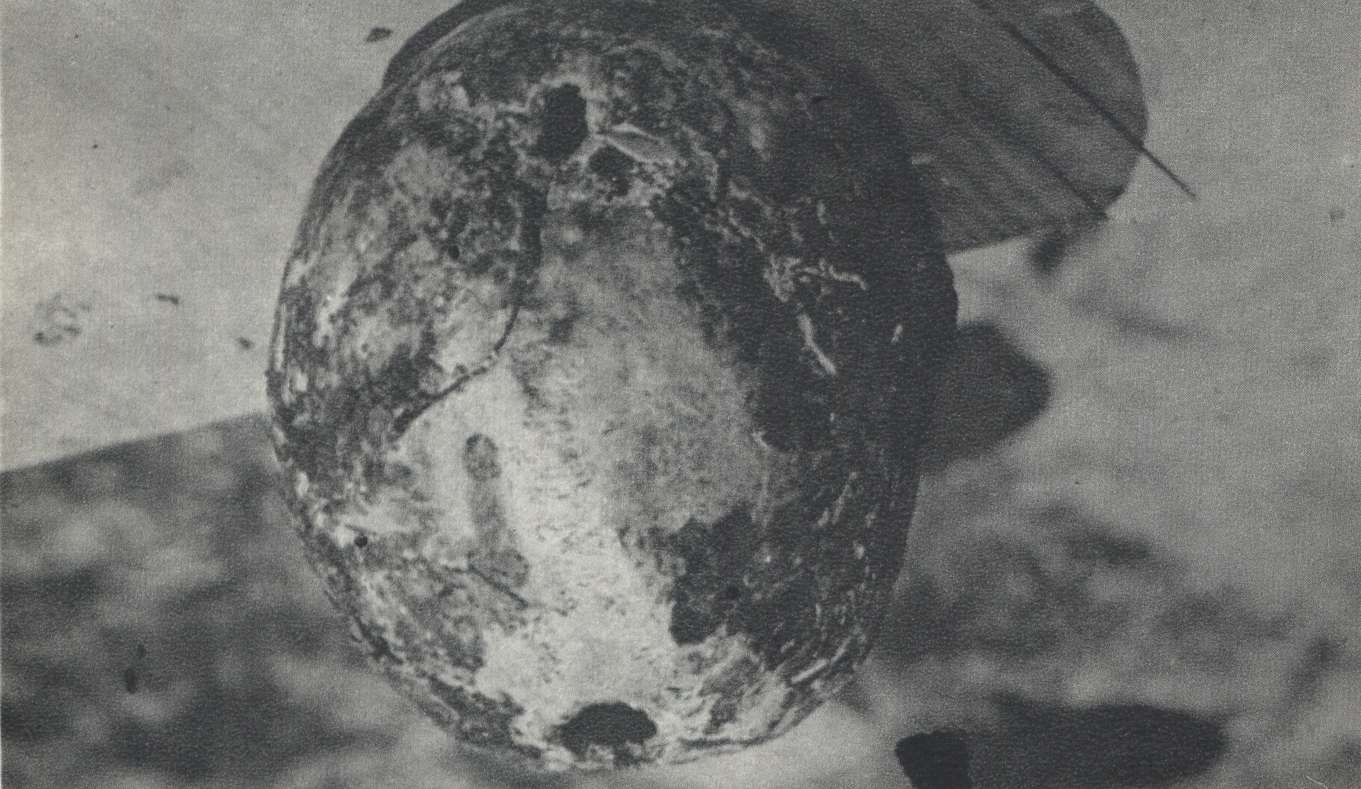
Human skull found in a mass grave. Note entrance and exit gunshot wounds.

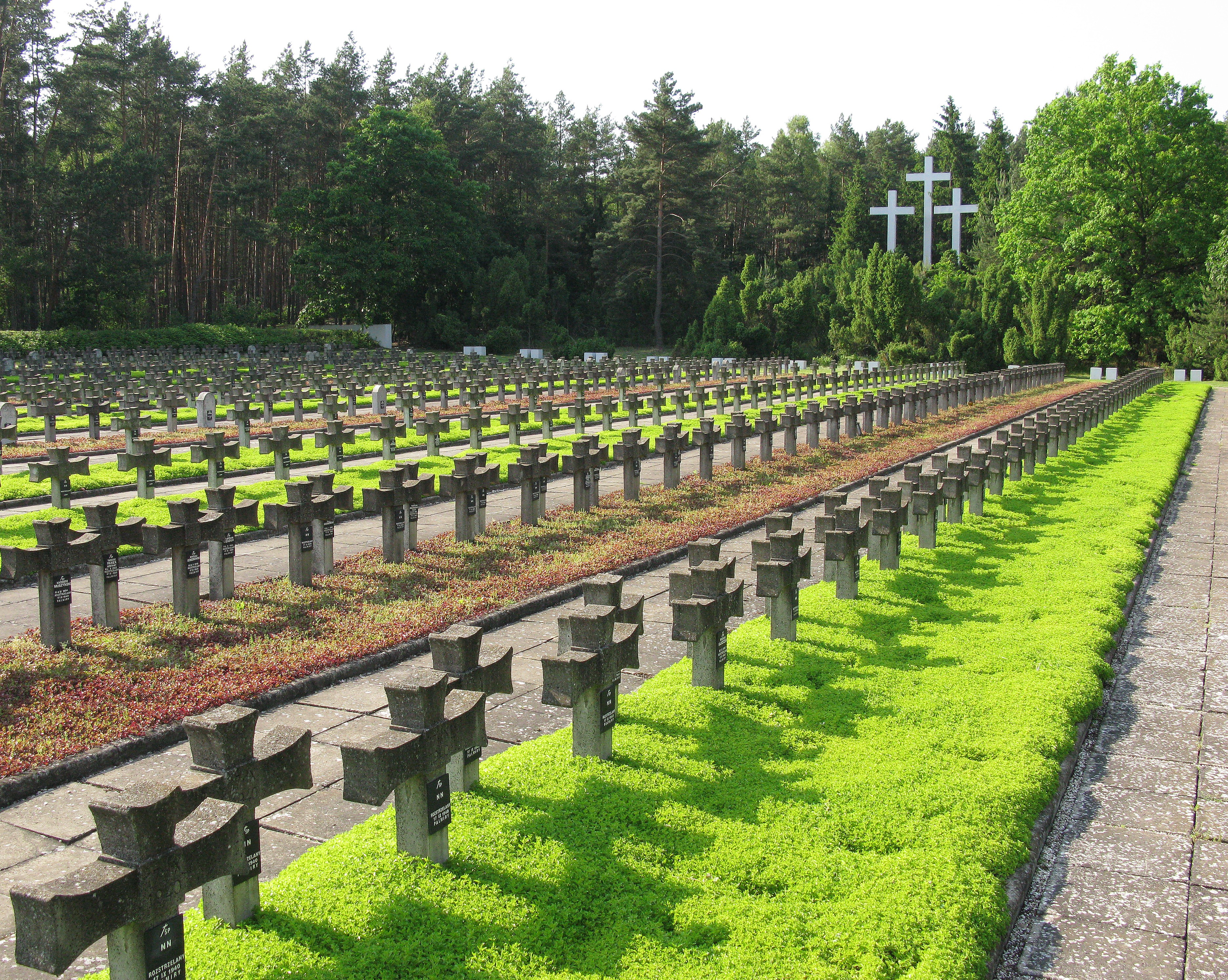
Cemetery and a mausoleum in Palmiry

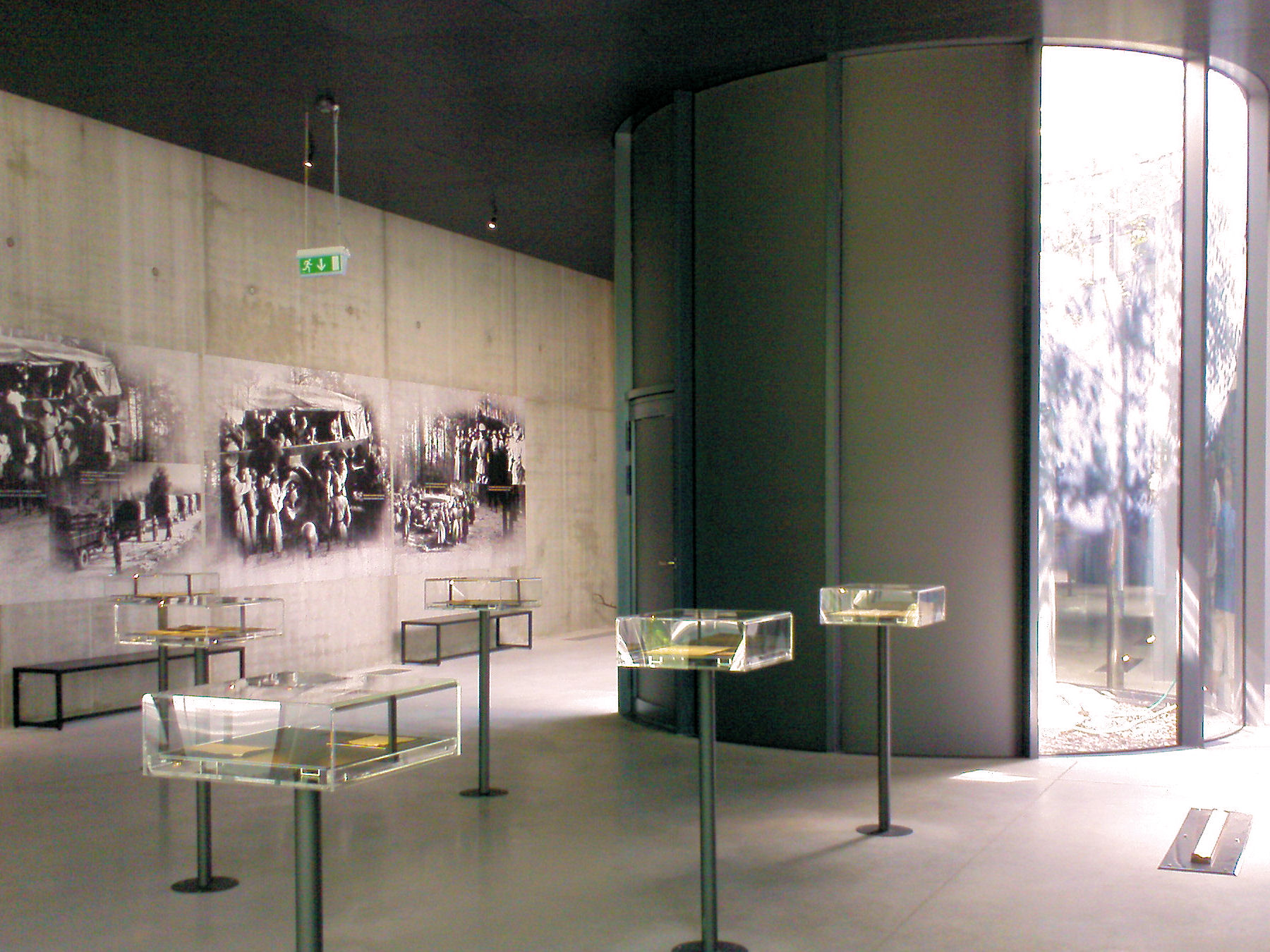
Palmiry National Memorial Museum. Part of the exposition

After the war, the Polish Red Cross, supported by the Chief Commission for the Investigation of German Crimes in Poland, began the search and exhumation process in Palmiry. The work was carried out between 25 November and 6 December 1945, and later from 28 March until the first months of summer 1946. Thanks to Adam Herbański and his subordinates from the Polish Forest Service, who in the years of occupation were risking their own lives to mark the places of execution, Polish investigators were able to find 24 mass graves. More than 1700 corpses were exhumed, but only 576 of them were identified. Later Polish historians were able to identify the names of another 480 victims. It is possible that some graves still lie undiscovered in the forest near Palmiry.

In 1948 the forest glade near Palmiry was transformed into a war cemetery and a mausoleum. Victims of Nazi terror whose bodies were found in some other places of execution within the so-called "Warsaw Death Ring" (Note: In Lasy Chojnowskie, Laski, Łuże, Szwedzkie Góry, Wólka Węglowa.) were also buried in the Palmiry cemetery. Altogether, approximately 2204 people are buried there. In 1973, the Palmiry National Memorial Museum, a branch of the Museum of Warsaw, was created in Palmiry.

Fr. Zygmunt Sajna, who was murdered in Palmiry on 17 September 1940, is one of the 108 Polish Martyrs of World War II beatified on 13 June 1999 by Pope John Paul II. Fr. Kazimierz Pieniążek (member of the Resurrectionist Congregation), another victim of the Palmiry massacre, has been accorded the title of Servant of God. He is currently one of the 122 Polish martyrs of the Second World War included in the beatification process initiated in 1994.

Palmiry has become, as Richard C. Lukas puts it, "one of the most notorious places of mass executions" in Poland. It is also one of the most famous sites of Nazi crimes in Poland. Along with the Katyn Forest it became a symbol of the martyrdom of the Polish intelligentsia during the Second World War. In 2011 Polish president Bronisław Komorowski said that "Palmiry is to some extent the Warsaw Katyn".

== Justice ==
Some of the Palmiry murderers were brought to justice. Ludwig Fischer, governor of Warsaw district in 1939–1945, and SS-Standartenführer Josef Meisinger, who occupied the post of SD and SiPo Commander in Warsaw in years 1939–1941, were arrested after the war by Allied forces and handed over to the Polish authorities. Their trial took place between 17 December 1946 and 24 February 1947. On 3 March 1947, the Supreme National Tribunal in Warsaw condemned both of them to death. Meisinger and Fischer were hanged in Mokotów Prison in March 1947.

SS-Gruppenführer Paul Moder, SS and Police Leader in Warsaw district in 1940–1941, was killed in action on the Eastern Front in February 1942.

== Bibliography ==
- Władysław Bartoszewski (1976). Palmiry (in Polish). Warszawa: Książka i Wiedza.
- Władysław Bartoszewski (1970). Warszawski pierścień śmierci 1939–1944 (in Polish). Warszawa: Interpress.
- Jochen Böhler; Klaus-Michael Mallmann; Jürgen Matthäus (2009). Einsatzgruppen w Polsce (in Polish). Warszawa: Bellona. ISBN 978-83-11-11588-0.
- Regina Domańska (1978). Pawiak – więzienie Gestapo. Kronika lat 1939–1944 (in Polish). Warszawa: Książka i Wiedza.
- Krzysztof Dunin-Wąsowicz (1984). Warszawa w latach 1939–1945 (in Polish). Warszawa: Państwowe Wydawnictwo Naukowe. ISBN 83-01-04207-9.
- Richard C. Lukas (2004). Forgotten Survivors: Polish Christians Remember the Nazi Occupation. University Press of Kansas. ISBN 978-0-7006-1350-2.
- Zygmunt Mańkowski (1992). Außerordentliche Befriedungsaktion 1940 – akcja AB na ziemiach polskich (in Polish). Warszawa: Zakład Historii Najnowszej Uniwersytetu Marii Skłodowskiej-Curie i OKBZpNP-IPN w Lublinie.
- Jerzy Misiak (2006). Palmiry (in Polish). Izabelin: Kampinoski Park Narodowy. ISBN 83-89961-22-9.
- Henning Pieper (2015). Fegelein's Horsemen and Genocidal Warfare. The SS Cavalry Brigade in the Soviet Union. Houndmills, Basingstoke: Palgrave Macmillan. ISBN 978-1-137-45633-5.
- Robert Rozett; Shmuel Spector (2013). Encyclopedia of the Holocaust. Routledge. ISBN 978-1135969509.
- Rafał Sierchuła; Wojciech Muszyński (2008-04-04). "Katyń i Palmiry 1940 (Dodatek specjalny IPN)". Niezależna Gazeta Polska (in Polish).
- Artur Stelmasiak (August 2008). "Dobry proboszcz na złe czasy" (in Polish). e-civitas.pl.
- Wojciech Świątkiewicz (21 June 2015). "Palmiry: warszawski Katyń" (in Polish). idziemy.pl.
- Maria Wardzyńska (2009). Był rok 1939. Operacja niemieckiej policji bezpieczeństwa w Polsce. Intelligenzaktion (in Polish). Warszawa: Instytut Pamięci Narodowej. ISBN 978-83-7629-063-8.
- "Palmiry National Memorial Museum (Miejsce Pamięci Palmiry)". warsawtour.pl. Archived from the original on June 14, 2017.
- "Prezydent: Palmiry to warszawski Katyń" (in Polish). prezydent.pl. March 31, 2011. Archived from the original on May 18, 2015.
