= Mogielnica (disambiguation) =

Mogielnica is a place in Masovian Voivodeship (east-central Poland).

Mogielnica may also refer to:

- Mogielnica, Płock County in Masovian Voivodeship (central Poland)
- Mogielnica, Subcarpathian Voivodeship (south-east Poland)
- Mogielnica, Siedlce County in Masovian Voivodeship (east Poland)
