= Halina Jaroszewiczowa =

Polish politician (1892–1940)

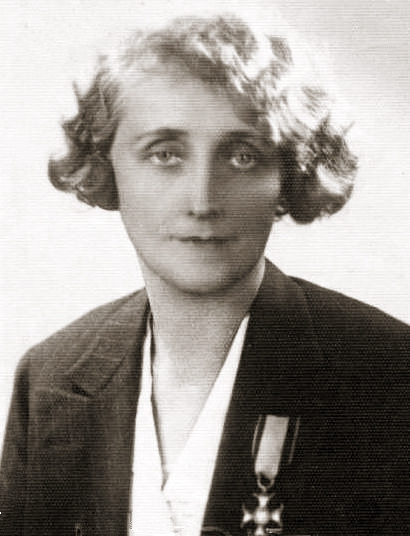

Member of the Senate
- In office 5 December 1930 – 10 July 1935

Deputy of the Sejm
- In office 4 October 1935 – 13 September 1938

Personal details
- Born: 7 November 1892; Dziewanowo, Congress Poland, Russian Empire
- Died: 21 June 1940 (aged 47); Kampinos Forest near Palmiry, General Government, Nazi Germany
- Political party: BBWR (until 1935)

Halina Maria (Helena) Jaroszewiczowa (7 November 1892 Dziewanowo, Płock Governorate – 21 June 1940) was a Polish politician in the 20th-century, who was killed by the Germans in the Palmiry massacre. She was member of the Polish parliament or Sejm and senator.
