= Gmina Drobin =

Gmina Drobin Drobin Commune
- Gmina
- Coat of arms
- Interactive map of Gmina Drobin
- Coordinates (Drobin): 52°44′27″N 19°59′21″E
- Country: Poland
- Voivodeship: Masovian
- County: Płock County
- Seat: Drobin

Area
  - Total: 143.20 km^{2} (55.29 sq mi)

Population (2006)
  - Total: 8,531
  - Density: 59.57/km^{2} (154.3/sq mi)
  - Urban: 2,980
  - Rural: 5,551
- Time zone: UTC+1 (CET)
  - Summer (DST): UTC+2 (CEST)
- Vehicle registration: WPL
- Website: http://www.drobin.eu/

Gmina Drobin is an urban-rural gmina (administrative district) in Płock County, Masovian Voivodeship, in central Poland. Its seat is the town of Drobin, which lies approximately 29 kilometres (18 mi) north-east of Płock and 90 km (56 mi) north-west of Warsaw.

The gmina covers an area of 143.19 square kilometres (55.3 sq mi), and as of 2006 its total population is 8,531 (out of which the population of Drobin amounts to 2,980, and the population of the rural part of the gmina is 5,551).

== Villages ==
Apart from the town of Drobin, Gmina Drobin contains the villages and settlements of Biskupice, Borowo, Brelki, Brzechowo, Budkowo, Chudzynek, Chudzyno, Cieśle, Cieszewko, Cieszewo, Dobrosielice Drugie, Dobrosielice Pierwsze, Dziewanowo, Karsy, Kłaki, Kowalewo, Kozłówko, Kozłowo, Krajkowo, Kuchary, Łęg Kościelny, Łęg Probostwo, Małachowo, Maliszewko, Mlice-Kostery, Mogielnica, Mogielnica-Kolonia, Nagórki Dobrskie, Nagórki-Olszyny, Niemczewo, Nowa Wieś, Psary, Rogotwórsk, Setropie, Siemienie, Sokolniki, Stanisławowo, Świerczyn, Świerczyn-Bęchy, Świerczynek, Tupadły, Warszewka, Wilkęsy and Wrogocin.

== Neighbouring gminas ==
Gmina Drobin is bordered by the gminas of Bielsk, Raciąż, Staroźreby and Zawidz.
