= Nagórki Dobrskie =

- Village
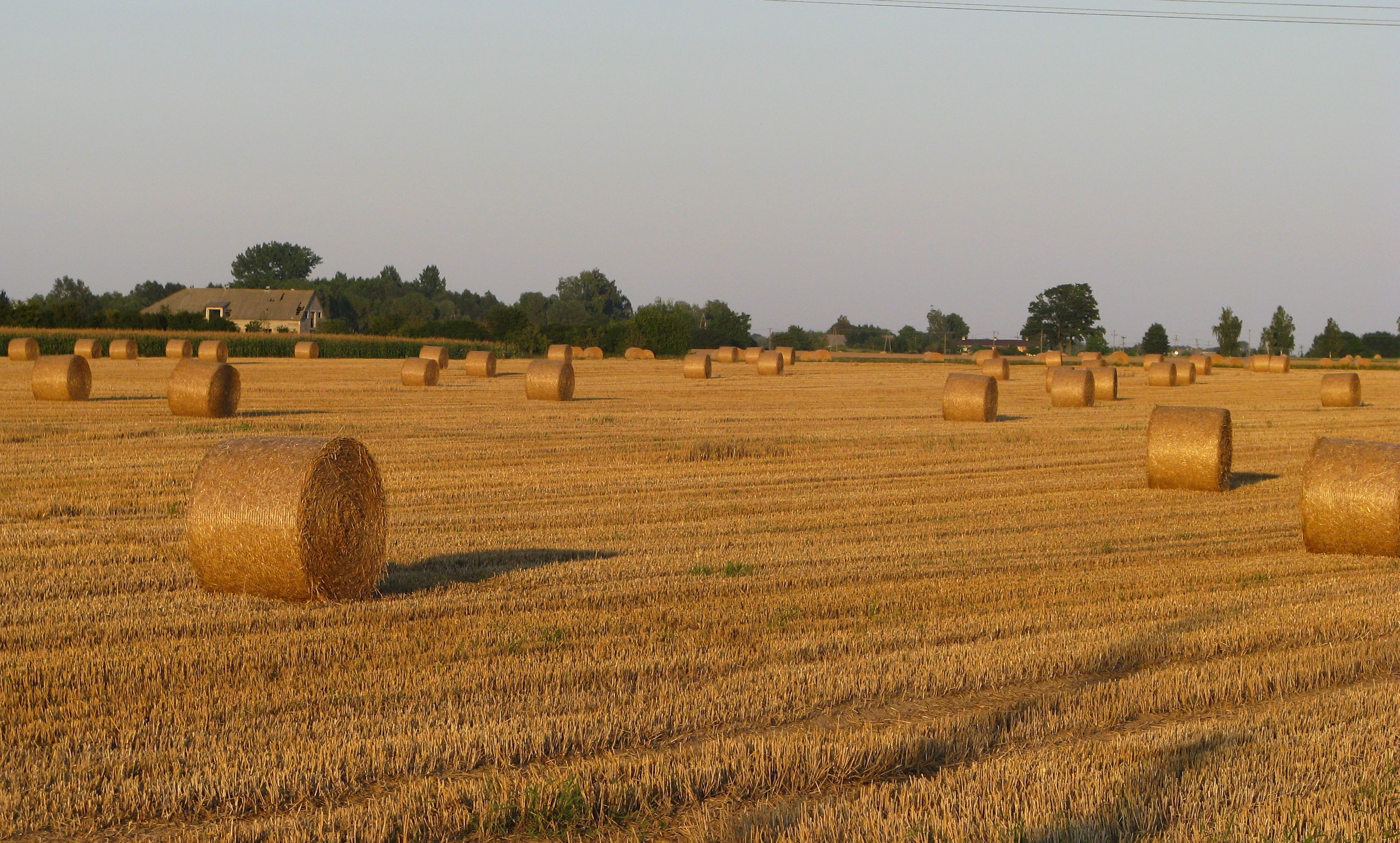

- Location within Poland
- Coordinates: 52°43′N 20°2′E
- Country: Poland
- Voivodeship: Masovian
- County: Płock
- Gmina: Drobin

Population
  - Total: 230
- Time zone: UTC+1 (CET)
  - Summer (DST): UTC+2 (CEST)
- Vehicle registration: WPL

Nagórki Dobrskie [naˈɡurki ˈdɔbrskʲɛ] is a village in the administrative district of Gmina Drobin, within Płock County, Masovian Voivodeship, in central Poland.
