= Mlice-Kostery =

- Village
- Location within Poland
- Coordinates: 52°42′11″N 19°52′48″E
- Country: Poland
- Voivodeship: Masovian
- County: Płock
- Gmina: Drobin
- Population: 80
- Time zone: UTC+1 (CET)
  - Summer (DST): UTC+2 (CEST)
- Vehicle registration: WPL

Mlice-Kostery [ˈmlit͡sɛ kɔsˈtɛrɨ] is a village in the administrative district of Gmina Drobin, within Płock County, Masovian Voivodeship, in central Poland.
