= Kozłówko, Masovian Voivodeship =

Kozłówko
- Village
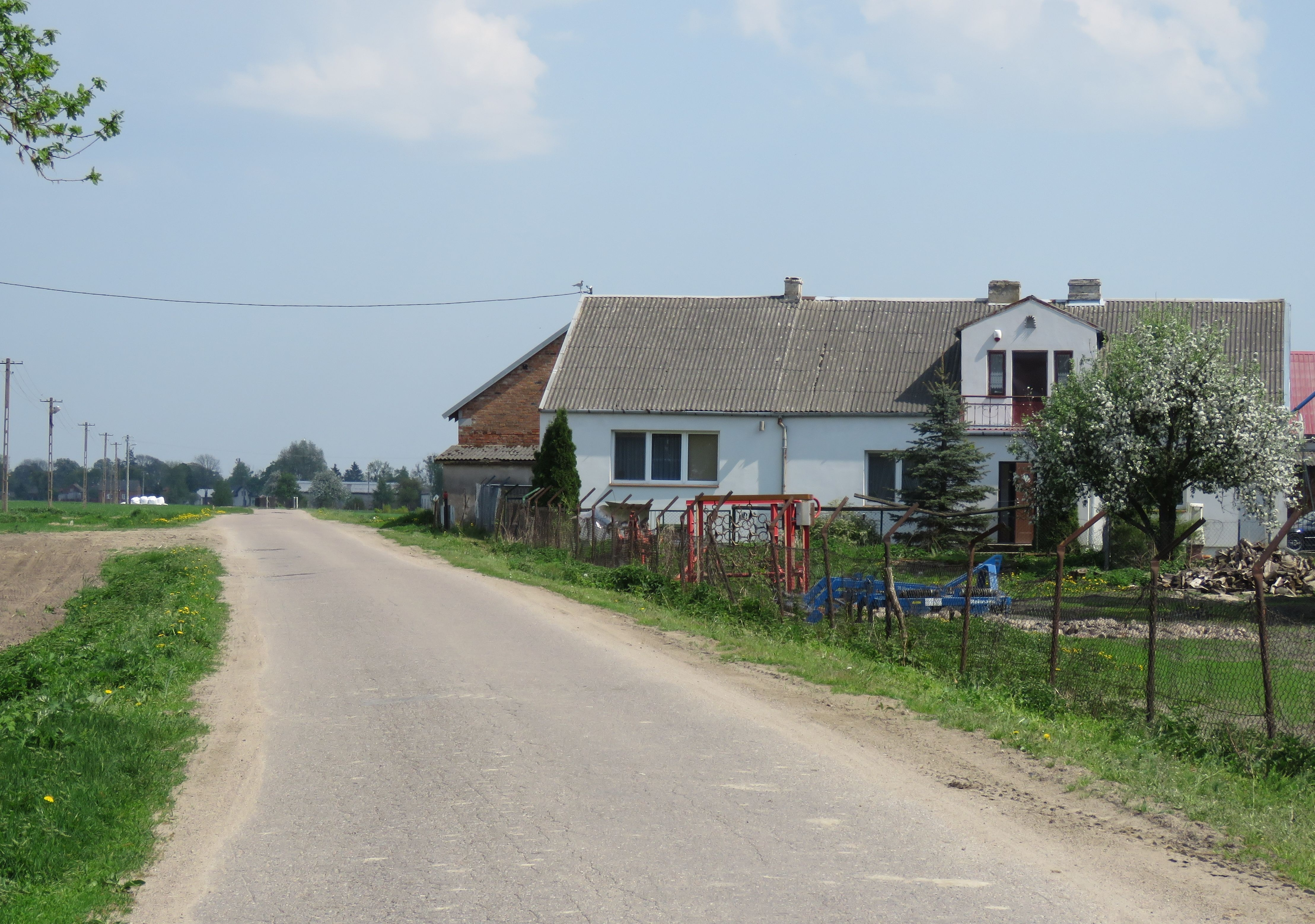
- Roadside house in Kozłówko

- Location within Poland
- Coordinates: 52°42′40″N 19°55′41″E
- Country: Poland
- Voivodeship: Masovian
- County: Płock
- Gmina: Drobin
- Time zone: UTC+1 (CET)
  - Summer (DST): UTC+2 (CEST)
- Vehicle registration: WPL

Kozłówko [kɔˈzwufkɔ] is a village in the administrative district of Gmina Drobin, within Płock County, Masovian Voivodeship, in central Poland.
