= Sokolniki, Płock County =

Sokolniki
- Village
- Location within Poland
- Coordinates: 52°41′03″N 20°03′42″E
- Country: Poland
- Voivodeship: Masovian
- County: Płock
- Gmina: Drobin
- Time zone: UTC+1 (CET)
  - Summer (DST): UTC+2 (CEST)
- Vehicle registration: WPL

Sokolniki [sɔkɔlˈɲikʲi] is a village in the administrative district of Gmina Drobin, within Płock County, Masovian Voivodeship, in central Poland.
