= Nagórki-Olszyny =

Village in Gmina Drobin, Poland

- Village
- Location within Poland
- Coordinates: 52°42′48″N 20°00′41″E
- Country: Poland
- Voivodeship: Masovian
- County: Płock
- Gmina: Drobin
- Time zone: UTC+1 (CET)
  - Summer (DST): UTC+2 (CEST)
- Vehicle registration: WPL

Nagórki-Olszyny [naˈɡurki ɔlˈʂɨnɨ] is a village in the administrative district of Gmina Drobin, within Płock County, Masovian Voivodeship, in central Poland.
