= Świerczyn-Bęchy =

- Village
- Location within Poland
- Coordinates: 52°44′28″N 19°56′00″E
- Country: Poland
- Voivodeship: Masovian
- County: Płock
- Gmina: Drobin
- Time zone: UTC+1 (CET)
  - Summer (DST): UTC+2 (CEST)
- Vehicle registration: WPL

Świerczyn-Bęchy (Polish pronunciation: [ˈɕfjɛrt͡ʂɨn ˈbɛ̃xɨ]) is a village in the administrative district of Gmina Drobin, within Płock County, Masovian Voivodeship, in central Poland.
