= Stanisławowo, Płock County =

Stanisławowo
- Village
- Location within Poland
- Coordinates: 52°41′37″N 19°57′18″E
- Country: Poland
- Voivodeship: Masovian
- County: Płock
- Gmina: Drobin
- Time zone: UTC+1 (CET)
  - Summer (DST): UTC+2 (CEST)
- Vehicle registration: WPL

Stanisławowo [staniswaˈvɔvɔ] is a village in the administrative district of Gmina Drobin, within Płock County, Masovian Voivodeship, in central Poland.
