= Rogotwórsk =

- Village
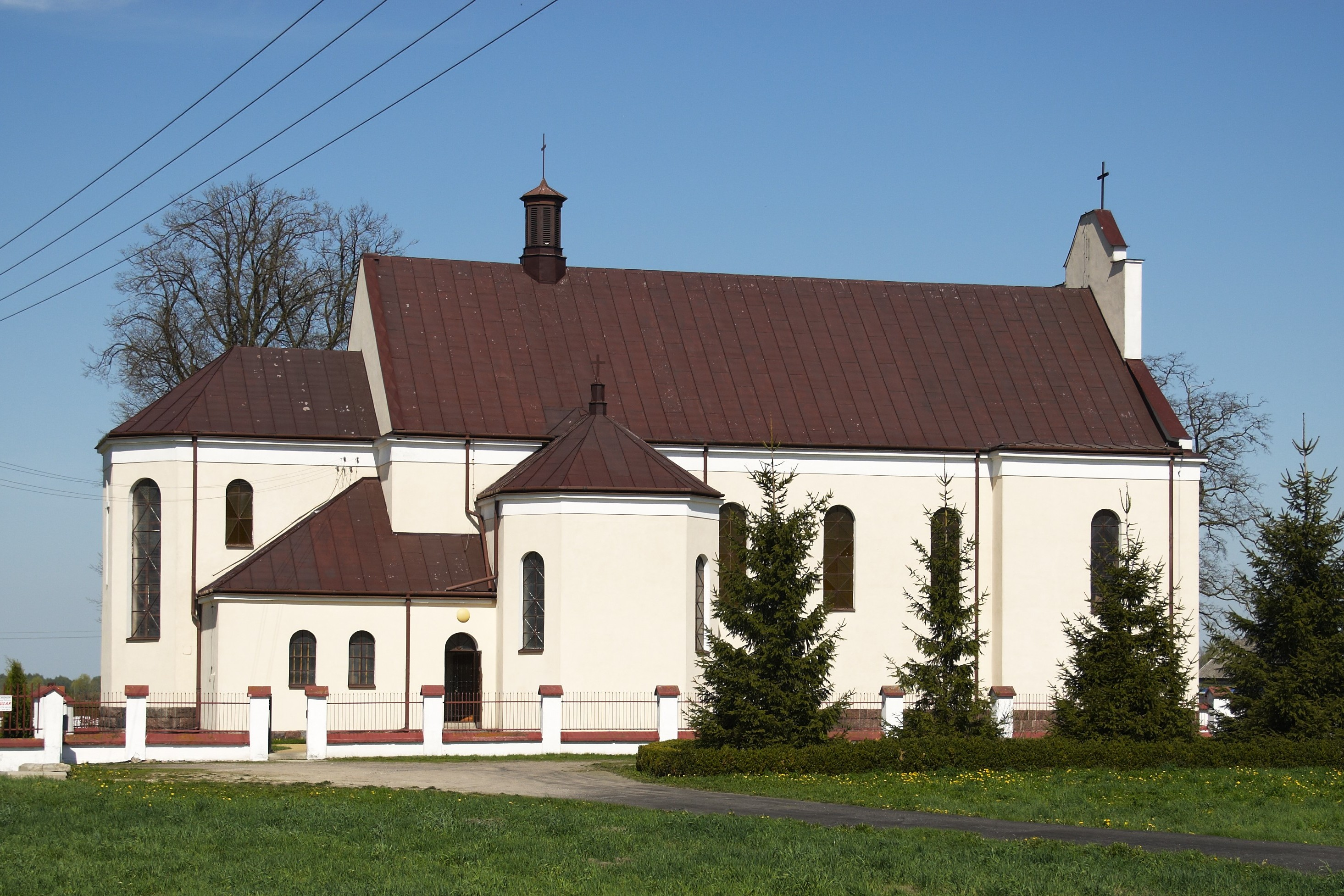
- Church of Saint Lawrence

- Location within Poland
- Coordinates: 52°41′32″N 20°03′08″E
- Country: Poland
- Voivodeship: Masovian
- County: Płock
- Gmina: Drobin
- Time zone: UTC+1 (CET)
  - Summer (DST): UTC+2 (CEST)
- Vehicle registration: WPL

Rogotwórsk [rɔˈɡɔtfursk] is a village in the administrative district of Gmina Drobin, within Płock County, Masovian Voivodeship, in central Poland.
