= Paul Moder =

Paul Moder (1 October 1896 in Neheim – 8 February 1942) was a German NSDAP politician. He was first elected to the Reichstag in July 1932 as a deputy from electoral constituency 13 (Schleswig-Holstein), switching to constituency 3 (Berlin-East) in March 1936. He was also a captain in the Freikorps in the early 1920s, and the SS and Police Leader in Warsaw from November 1939 to July 1941 with the rank of SS-Gruppenführer. Transferred to the Waffen SS, he served with the SS-Totenkopf Division and died in action on the eastern front at the Demyansk Pocket.
