= Dziewanowo =

- Village
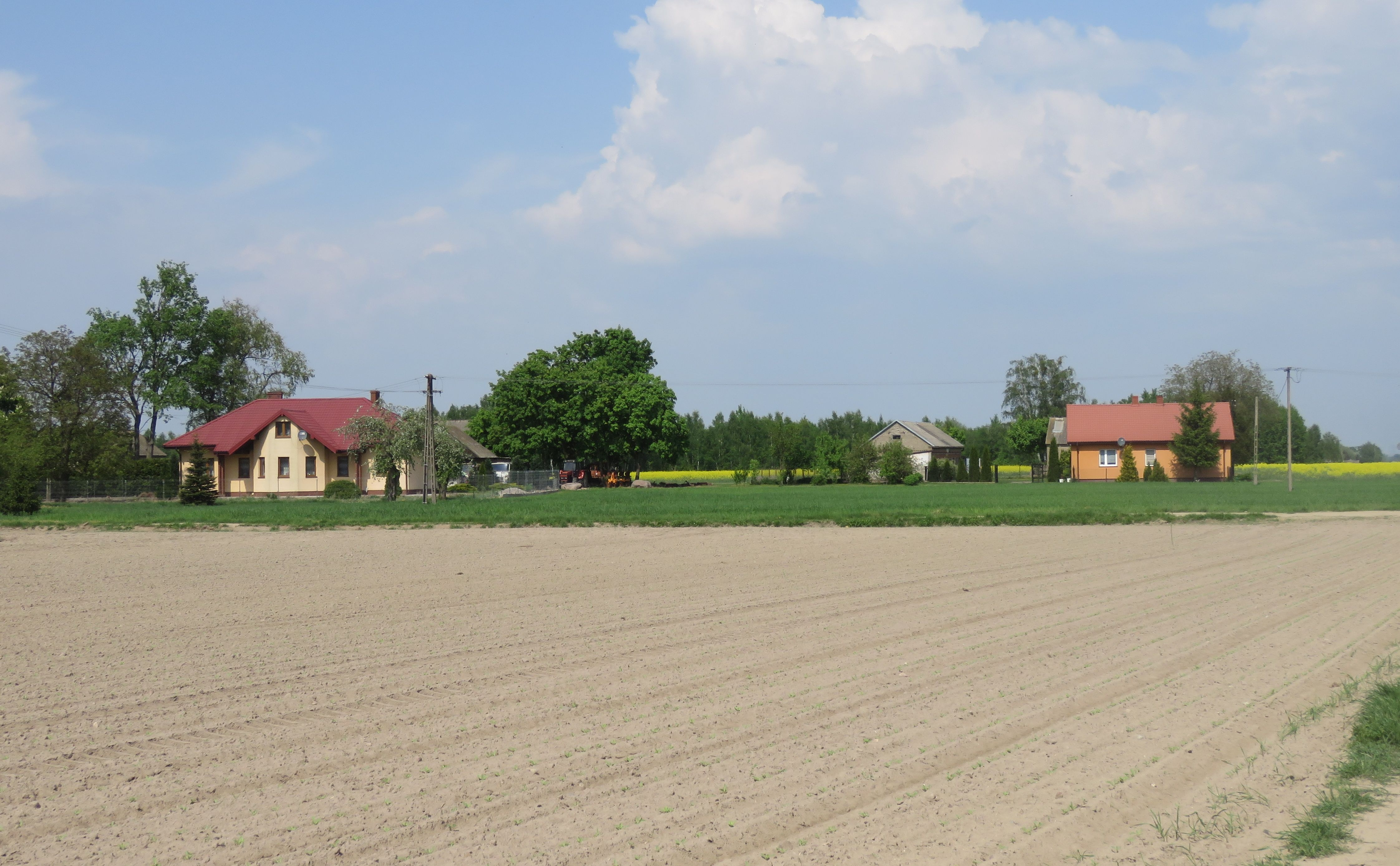
- View from Dziewanowo

- Flag Coat of arms

- Location within Poland
- Coordinates: 52°43′56″N 19°54′57″E
- Country: Poland
- Voivodeship: Masovian
- County: Płock
- Gmina: Drobin
- Time zone: UTC+1 (CET)
  - Summer (DST): UTC+2 (CEST)
- Vehicle registration: WPL

Dziewanowo [d͡ʑɛvaˈnɔvɔ] is a village in the administrative district of Gmina Drobin, within Płock County, Masovian Voivodeship, in central Poland.
