= Wesel (disambiguation) =

Wesel is a city in North Rhine-Westphalia, Germany.

Wesel may also refer to:

- Wesel (district), North Rhine-Westphalia, Germany
- Wesel station, Wessel, Germany
- Wesel citadel, Wessel, Germany
- A former village, now part of Jeżewo-Wesel, Poland

== People with the surname ==
- Hermann Wesel (died 1563), German ecclesiastic in Livonia and the last Roman Catholic Bishop of Dorpat (Tartu)
- Johann Ruchrat von Wesel (died 1481), German Scholastic theologian
- Andries van Wesel, known as Andreas Vesalius (1514– 1564), Brabançon anatomist and physician
