= Krajkowo =

Krajkowo may refer to the following places:

- Krajkowo, Greater Poland Voivodeship (west-central Poland)
- Krajkowo, Płock County in Masovian Voivodeship (east-central Poland)
- Krajkowo, Płońsk County in Masovian Voivodeship (east-central Poland)
