= Podborne =

Podborne may refer to the following places in Poland:

- Kowalewo Podborne
- Kraszewo Podborne
- Toczyski Podborne
