= Szczepkowo =

Szczepkowo may refer to the following places:

- Szczepkowo, Masovian Voivodeship (east-central Poland)
- Szczepkowo, Pomeranian Voivodeship (north Poland)
- Szczepkowo, Warmian-Masurian Voivodeship (north Poland)
