= Pólka-Raciąż =

Village in Gmina Raciąż, Poland

- Village
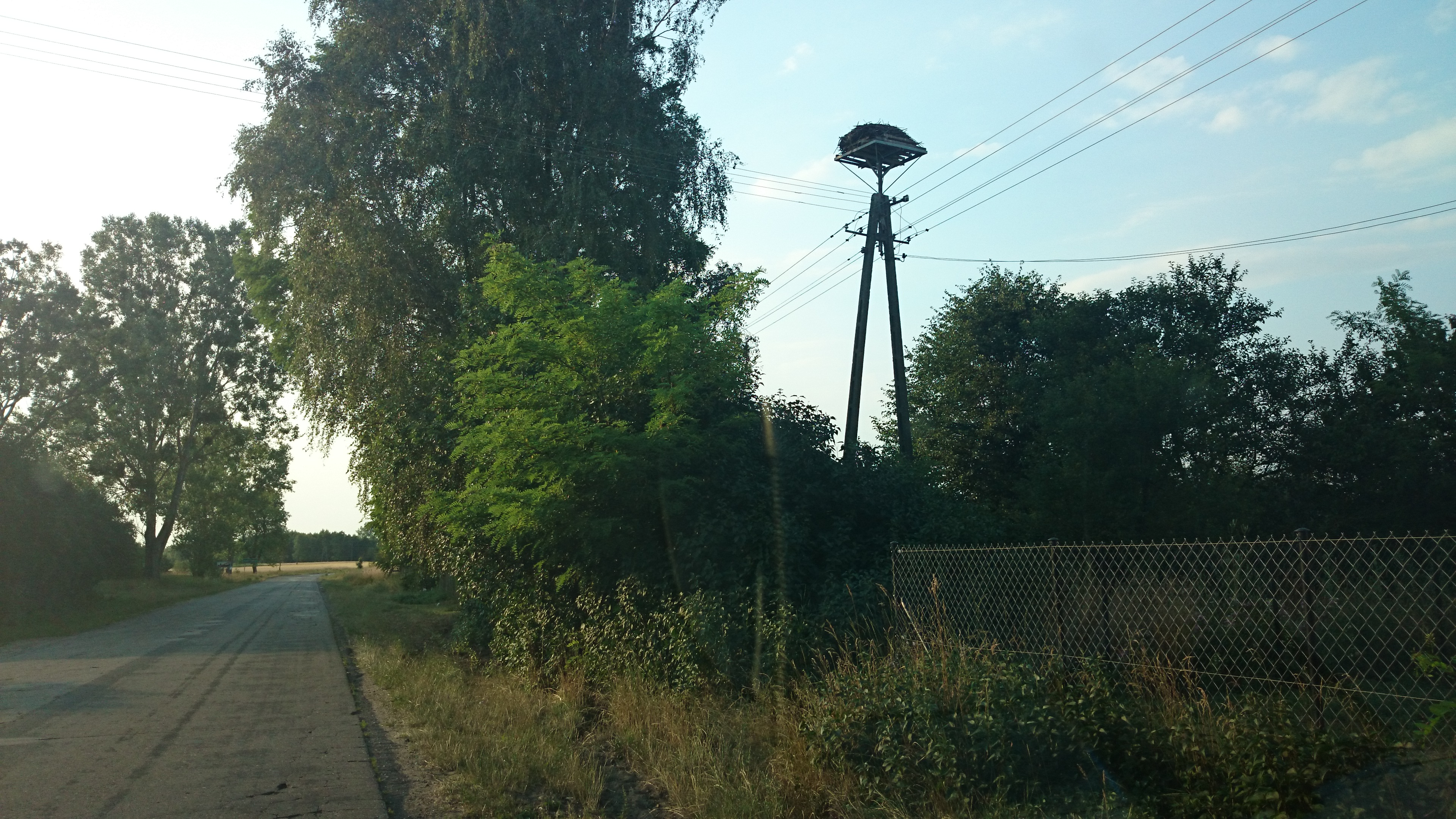

- Location within Poland
- Coordinates: 52°49′02″N 20°06′12″E
- Country: Poland
- Voivodeship: Masovian
- County: Płońsk
- Gmina: Raciąż
- Population: 1,500

Pólka-Raciąż [ˈpulka ˈrat͡ɕɔ̃ʂ] is a village in the administrative district of Gmina Raciąż, within Płońsk County, Masovian Voivodeship, in east-central Poland.
