= Cieciersk =

- Village
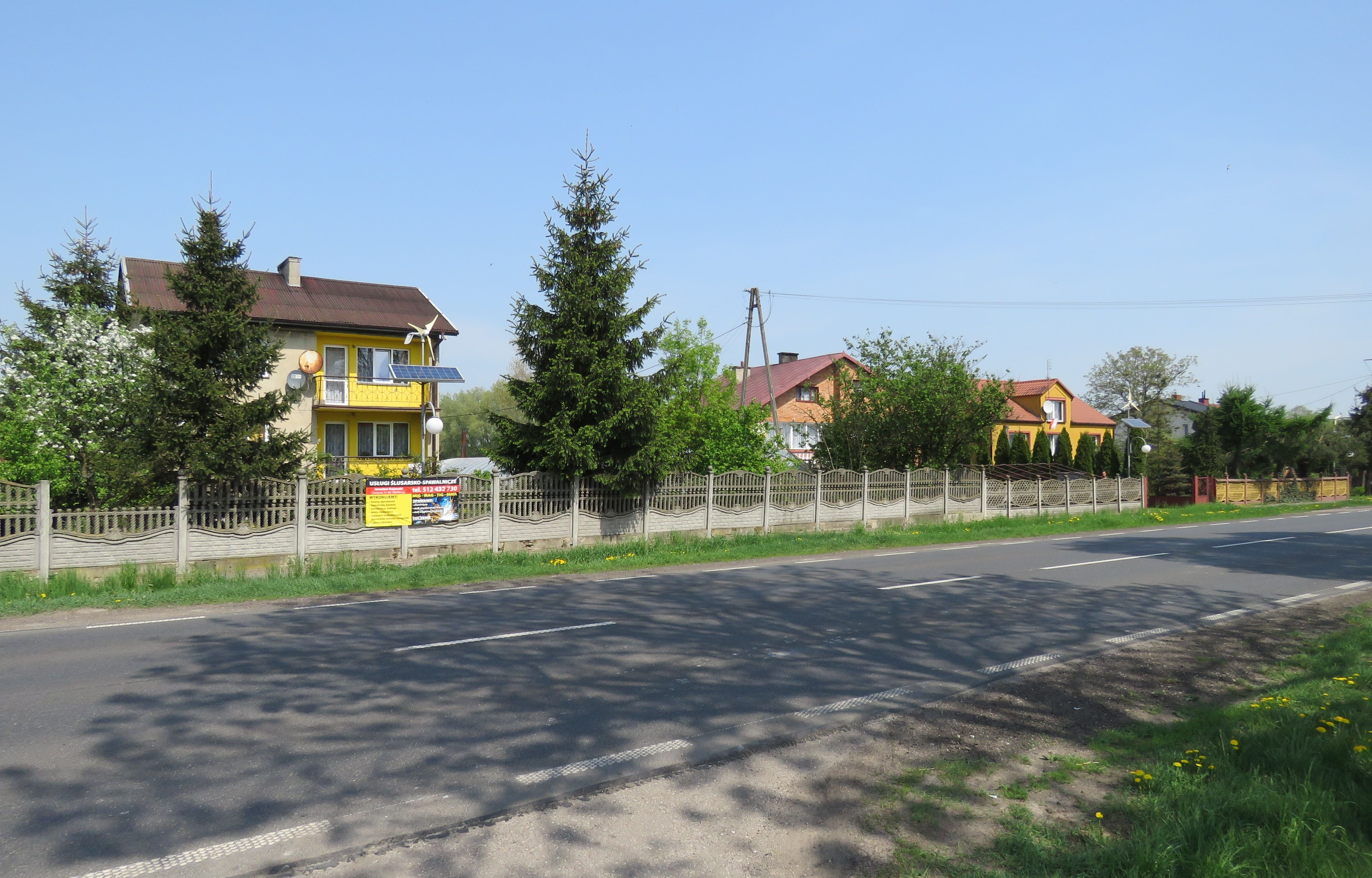

- Location within Poland
- Coordinates: 52°47′N 20°5′E
- Country: Poland
- Voivodeship: Masovian
- County: Płońsk
- Gmina: Raciąż

Cieciersk [ˈt͡ɕɛt͡ɕɛrsk] is a village in the administrative district of Gmina Raciąż, within Płońsk County, Masovian Voivodeship, in east-central Poland.
