= Zdunówek =

- Village
- Location within Poland
- Coordinates: 52°46′57″N 20°10′43″E
- Country: Poland
- Voivodeship: Masovian
- County: Płońsk
- Gmina: Raciąż

Zdunówek [zduˈnuvɛk] is a village in the administrative district of Gmina Raciąż, within Płońsk County, Masovian Voivodeship, in east-central Poland.
