= Gmina Raciąż =

Gmina Raciąż Raciąż Commune
- Gmina
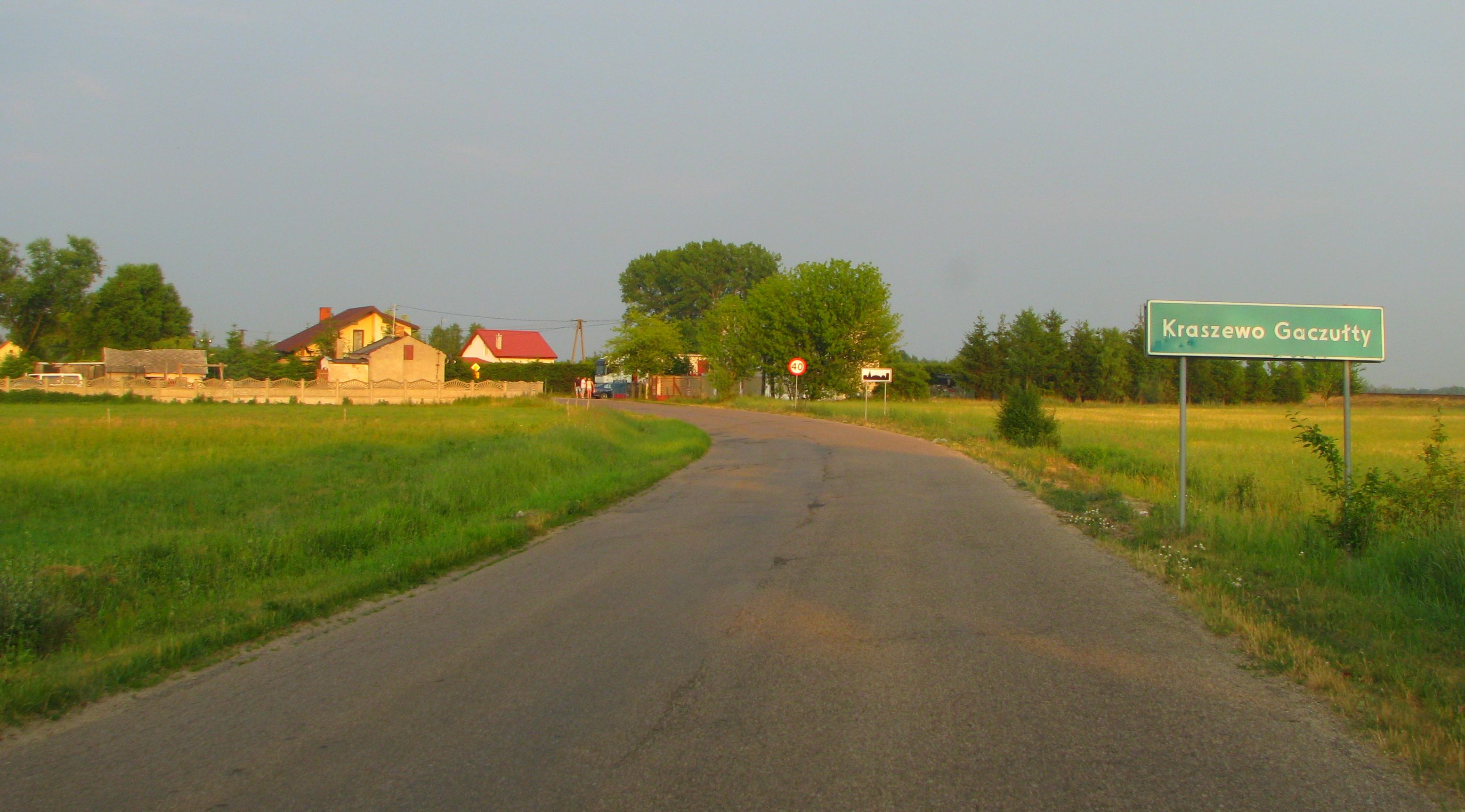
- Interactive map of Gmina Raciąż
- Coordinates (Raciąż): 52°46′46″N 20°6′55″E
- Country: Poland
- Voivodeship: Masovian
- County: Płońsk
- Seat: Raciąż

Area
  - Total: 248.79 km^{2} (96.06 sq mi)

Population (2013)
  - Total: 8,707
  - Density: 35.00/km^{2} (90.64/sq mi)
- Website: www.gmina.raciaz.iap.pl

Gmina Raciąż is a rural gmina (administrative district) in Płońsk County, Masovian Voivodeship, in east-central Poland. Its seat is the town of Raciąż, although the town is not part of the territory of the gmina.

The gmina covers an area of 248.79 square kilometres (96.1 sq mi), and as of 2006 its total population is 8,534 (8,707 in 2013).

== Villages ==
Gmina Raciąż contains the villages and settlements of:

- Bielany
- Bogucin
- Budy Kraszewskie
- Charzyny
- Chyczewo
- Cieciersk
- Ćwiersk
- Dobrska-Kolonia
- Dobrska-Włościany
- Draminek
- Drozdowo
- Druchowo
- Folwark-Raciąż
- Grzybowo
- Jeżewo-Wesel
- Kaczorowy
- Kiełbowo
- Kiniki
- Kocięcin-Brodowy
- Kocięcin-Tworki
- Kodłutowo
- Kossobudy
- Koziebrody
- Kozolin
- Krajkowo
- Krajkowo-Budki
- Kraśniewo
- Kraszewo-Czubaki
- Kraszewo-Falki
- Kraszewo-Gaczułty
- Kraszewo Podborne
- Kraszewo-Rory
- Kraszewo-Sławęcin
- Kruszenica
- Łempinek
- Łempino
- Lipa
- Mała Wieś
- Malewo
- Młody Niedróż
- Nowe Gralewo
- Nowe Młodochowo
- Nowy Komunin
- Pęsy
- Pólka-Raciąż
- Sierakowo
- Sikory
- Stare Gralewo
- Stare Młodochowo
- Stary Komunin
- Stary Niedróż
- Strożęcin
- Szapsk
- Szczepkowo
- Unieck
- Wępiły
- Witkowo
- Zdunówek
- Złotopole
- Żukowo-Strusie
- Żukowo-Wawrzonki
- Żychowo

== Neighbouring gminas ==
Gmina Raciąż is bordered by the town of Raciąż and by the gminas of Baboszewo, Drobin, Glinojeck, Radzanów, Siemiątkowo, Staroźreby, Strzegowo and Zawidz.
