= Młody Niedróż =

Village in Gmina Raciąż, Poland

- Village
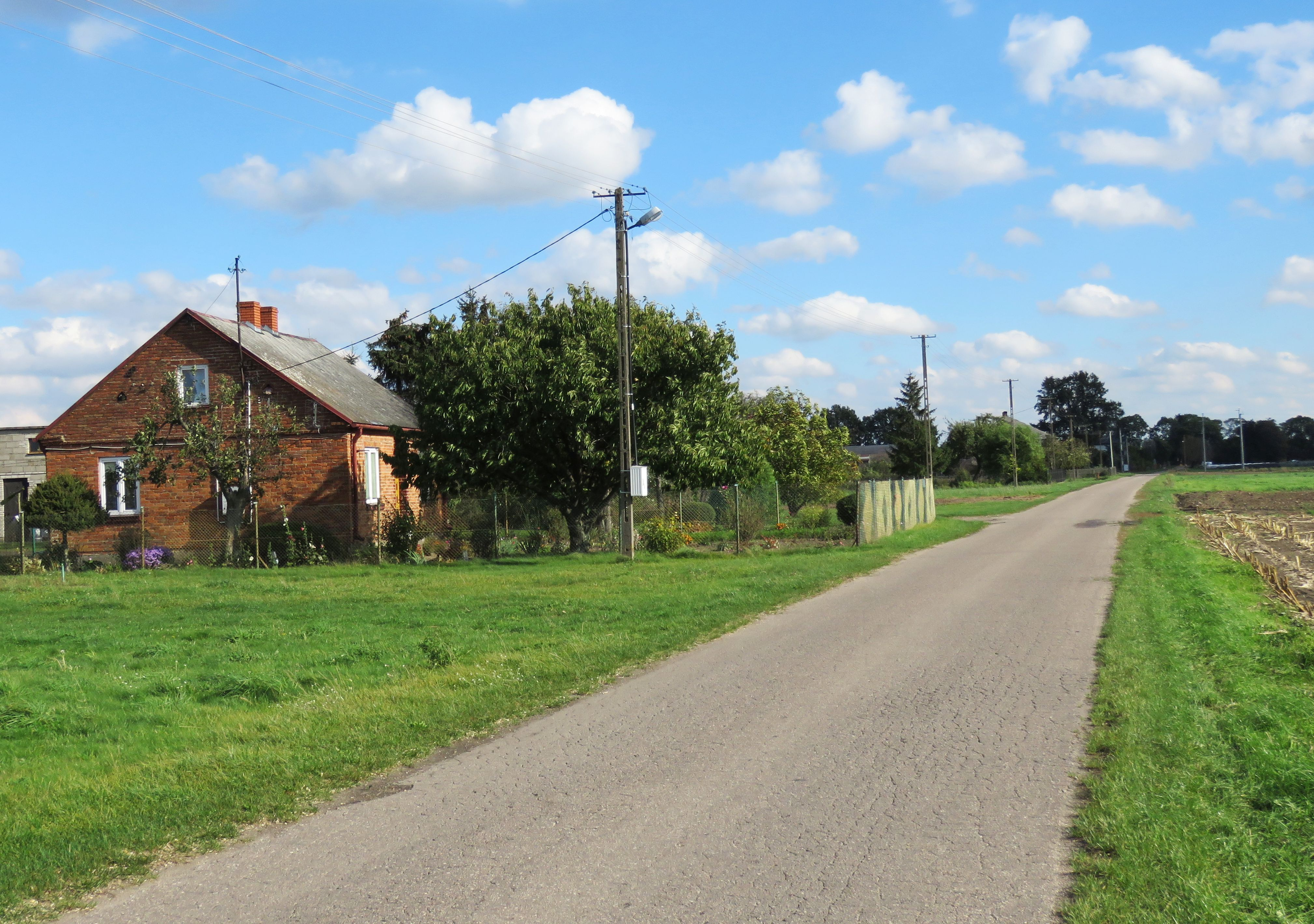

- Location within Poland
- Coordinates: 52°47′07″N 19°59′39″E
- Country: Poland
- Voivodeship: Masovian
- County: Płońsk
- Gmina: Raciąż

Młody Niedróż [ˈmwɔdɨ ˈɲɛdruʂ] is a village in the administrative district of Gmina Raciąż, within Płońsk County, Masovian Voivodeship, in east-central Poland.
