= Unieck =

- Village
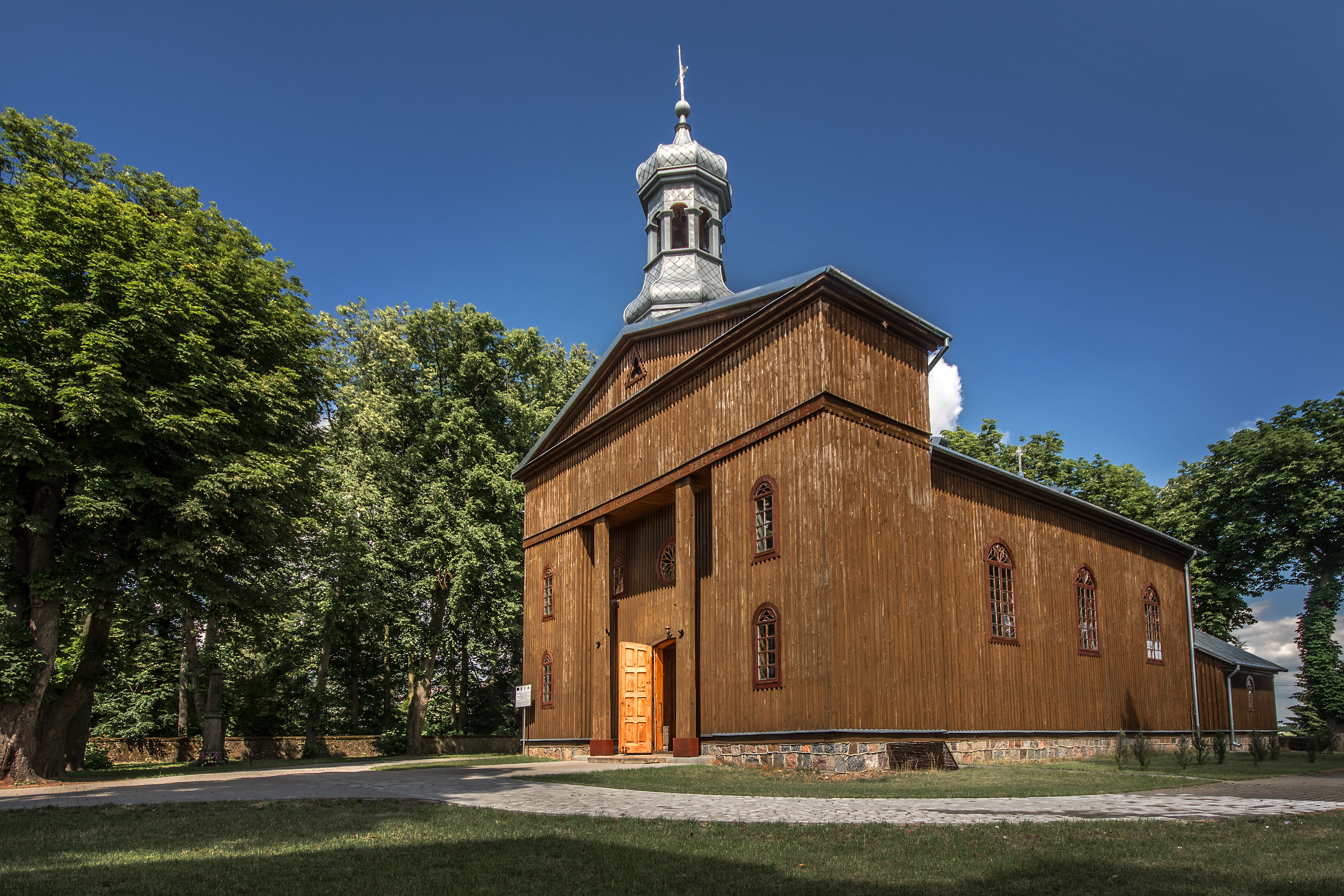
- Saint James the Greater church in Unieck

- Location within Poland
- Coordinates: 52°52′N 20°12′E
- Country: Poland
- Voivodeship: Masovian
- County: Płońsk
- Gmina: Raciąż
- Time zone: UTC+1 (CET)
  - Summer (DST): UTC+2 (CEST)

Unieck [ˈuɲɛt͡sk] is a village in the administrative district of Gmina Raciąż, within Płońsk County, Masovian Voivodeship, in north-central Poland.

Eight Polish citizens were murdered by Nazi Germany in the village during World War II.
