= Wępiły =

- Village
- Location within Poland
- Coordinates: 52°41′55″N 20°04′45″E
- Country: Poland
- Voivodeship: Masovian
- County: Płońsk
- Gmina: Raciąż

Wępiły [vɛmˈpiwɨ] is a village in the administrative district of Gmina Raciąż, within Płońsk County, Masovian Voivodeship, in east-central Poland.
