= Złotopole, Masovian Voivodeship =

Złotopole
- Village
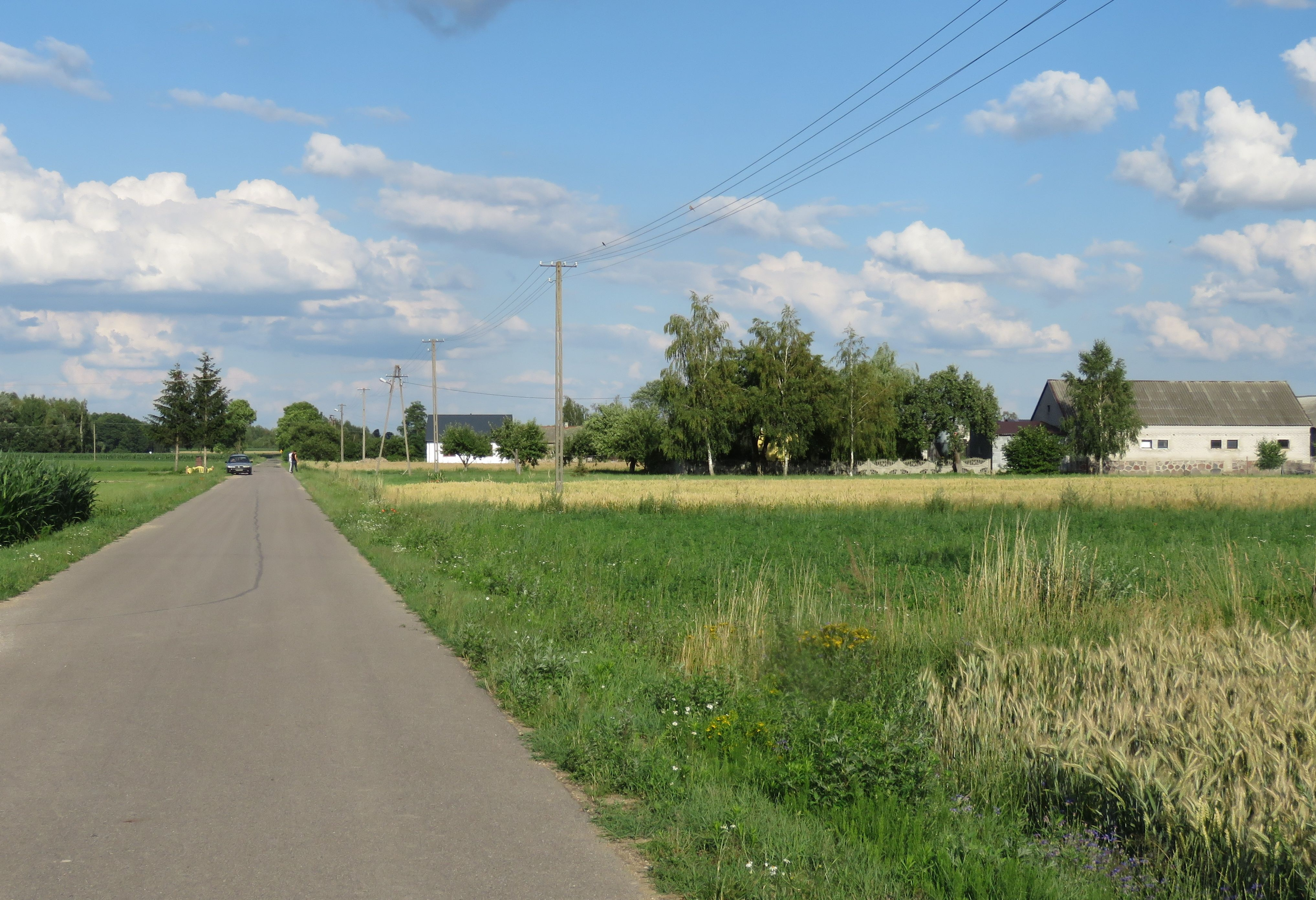

- Location within Poland
- Coordinates: 52°41′35″N 20°07′23″E
- Country: Poland
- Voivodeship: Masovian
- County: Płońsk
- Gmina: Raciąż

Złotopole [zwɔtɔˈpɔlɛ] is a village in the administrative district of Gmina Raciąż, within Płońsk County, Masovian Voivodeship, in east-central Poland.
