= Bielany, Płońsk County =

Bielany
- Village
- Location within Poland
- Coordinates: 52°49′N 20°1′E
- Country: Poland
- Voivodeship: Masovian
- County: Płońsk
- Gmina: Raciąż

Bielany [bjɛˈlanɨ] is a village in the administrative district of Gmina Raciąż, within Płońsk County, Masovian Voivodeship, in east-central Poland.
