= Drozdowo, Płońsk County =

Drozdowo
- Village
- Location within Poland
- Coordinates: 52°45′N 20°12′E
- Country: Poland
- Voivodeship: Masovian
- County: Płońsk
- Gmina: Raciąż

Drozdowo [drɔzˈdɔvɔ] is a village in the administrative district of Gmina Raciąż, within Płońsk County, Masovian Voivodeship, in east-central Poland.
