= Grzybowo, Płońsk County =

Grzybowo
- Village
- Location within Poland
- Coordinates: 52°50′21″N 20°12′58″E
- Country: Poland
- Voivodeship: Masovian
- County: Płońsk
- Gmina: Raciąż

Grzybowo [ɡʐɨˈbɔvɔ] is a village in the administrative district of Gmina Raciąż, within Płońsk County, Masovian Voivodeship, in east-central Poland.
