= Folwark-Raciąż =

- Village
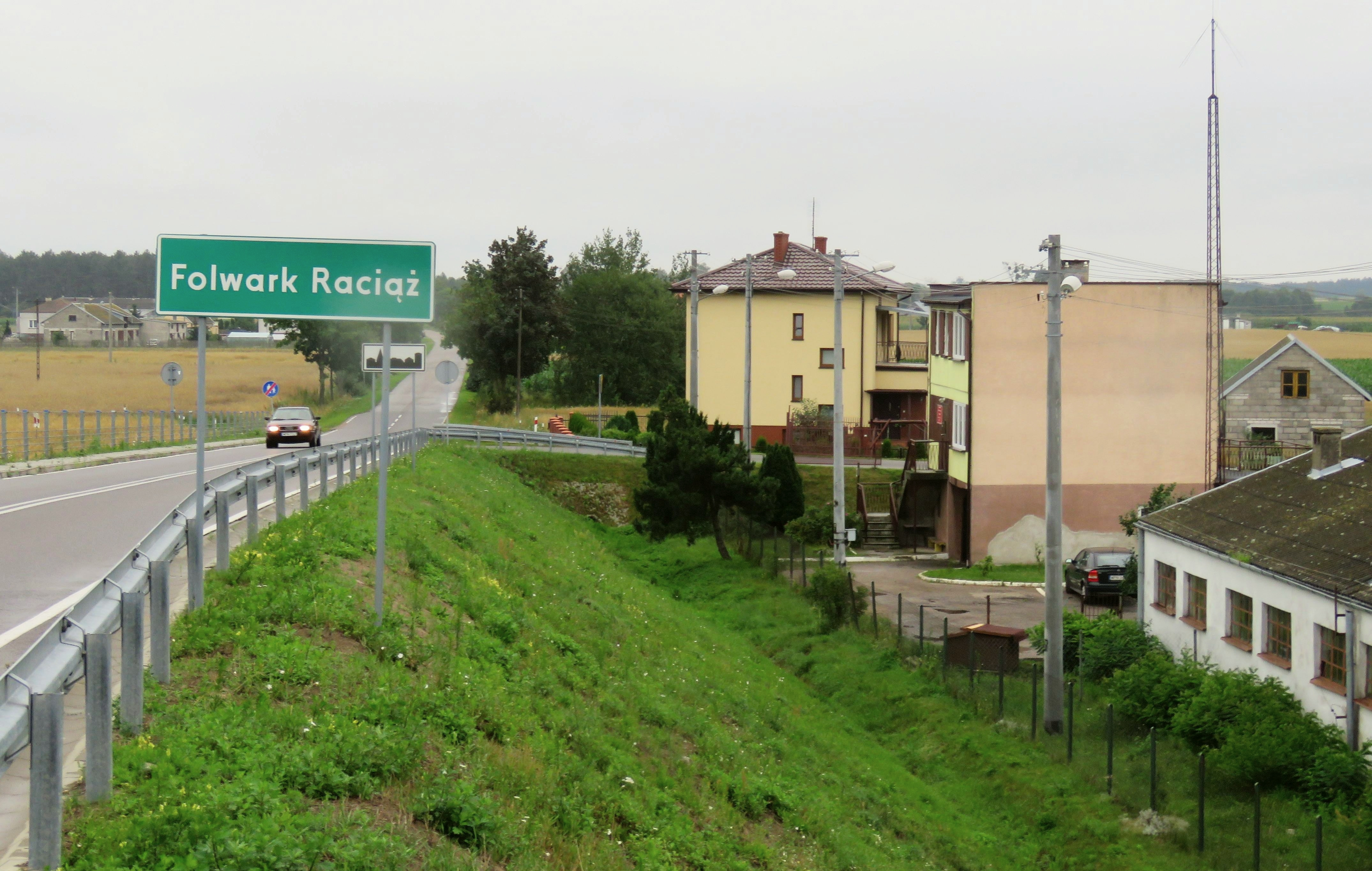

- Location within Poland
- Coordinates: 52°46′14″N 20°07′41″E
- Country: Poland
- Voivodeship: Masovian
- County: Płońsk
- Gmina: Raciąż

Folwark-Raciąż [ˈfɔlvark ˈrat͡ɕɔ̃ʂ] is a village in the administrative district of Gmina Raciąż, within Płońsk County, Masovian Voivodeship, in east-central Poland.
