= Dobrska-Kolonia =

- Village
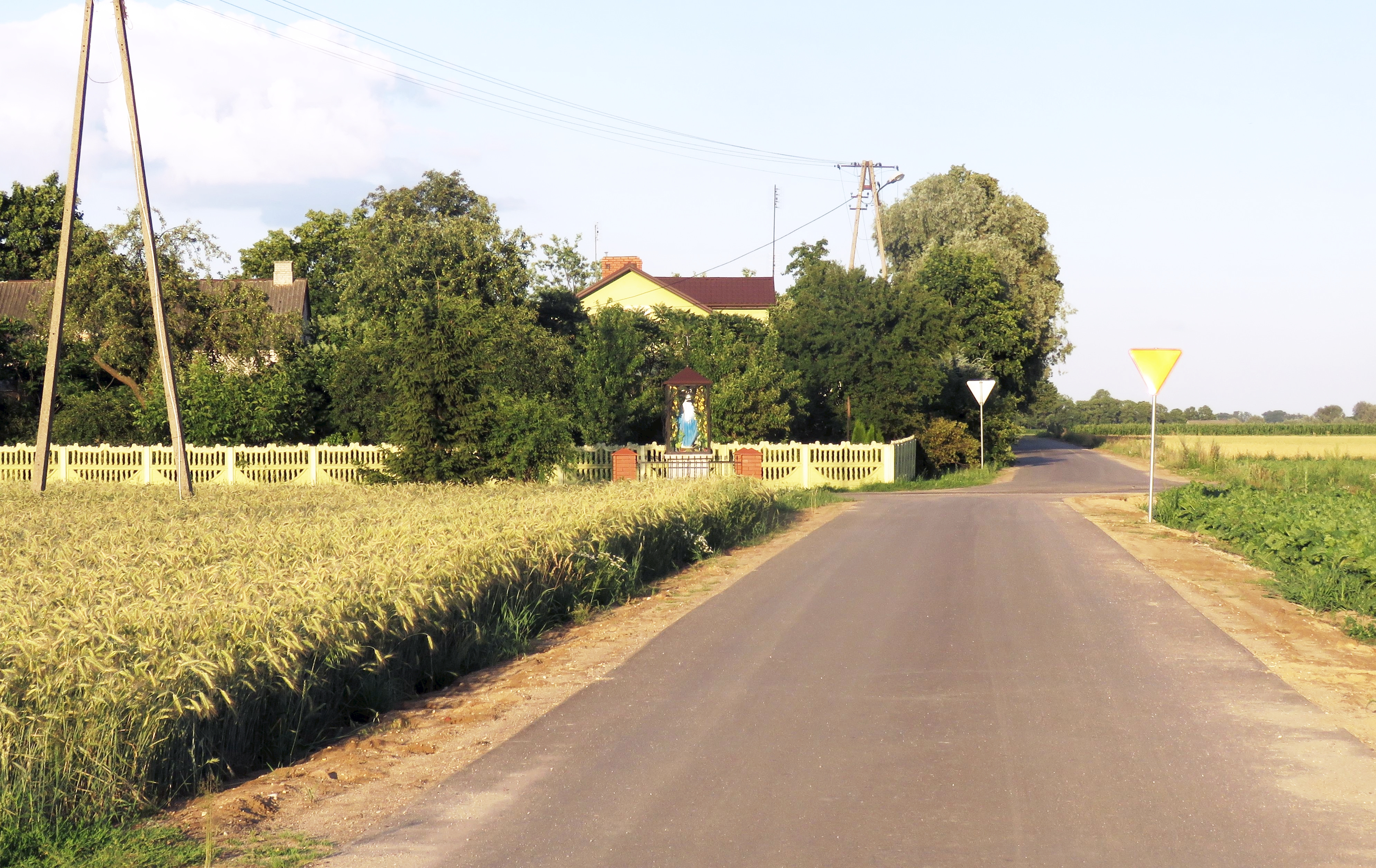

- Location within Poland
- Coordinates: 52°40′31″N 20°05′55″E
- Country: Poland
- Voivodeship: Masovian
- County: Płońsk
- Gmina: Raciąż

Dobrska-Kolonia [ˈdɔbrska kɔˈlɔɲa] is a village in the administrative district of Gmina Raciąż, within Płońsk County, Masovian Voivodeship, in east-central Poland.
