= Malewo, Masovian Voivodeship =

Malewo
- Village
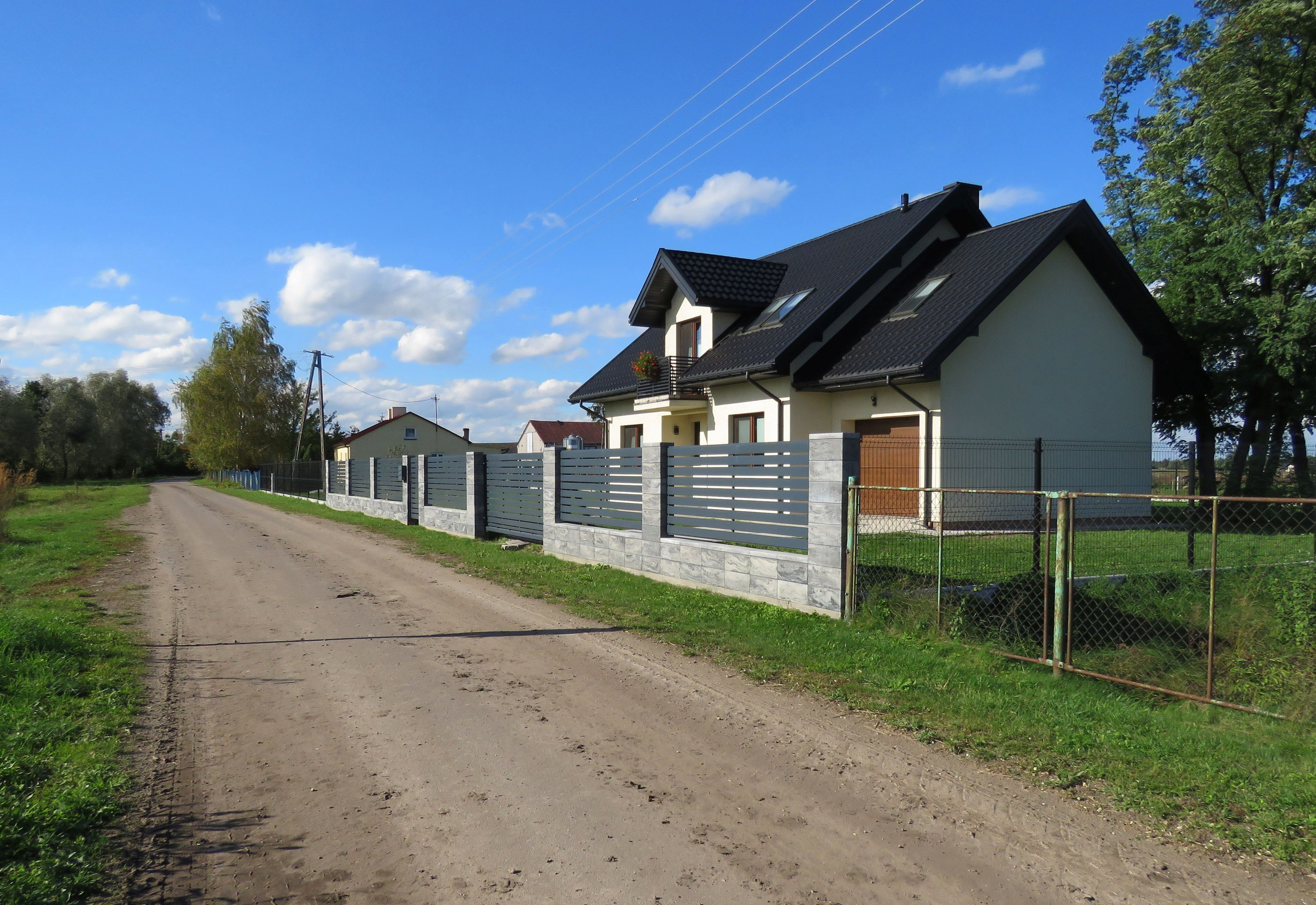

- Location within Poland
- Coordinates: 52°47′38″N 19°59′04″E
- Country: Poland
- Voivodeship: Masovian
- County: Płońsk
- Gmina: Raciąż

Malewo [maˈlɛvɔ] is a village in the administrative district of Gmina Raciąż, within Płońsk County, Masovian Voivodeship, in east-central Poland.
