= Kraśniewo, Masovian Voivodeship =

Village in Gmina Raciąż, Poland

Kraśniewo
- Village
- Location within Poland
- Coordinates: 52°41′06″N 20°08′40″E
- Country: Poland
- Voivodeship: Masovian
- County: Płońsk
- Gmina: Raciąż
- Population: 65

Kraśniewo [kraɕˈɲɛvɔ] is a village in the administrative district of Gmina Raciąż, within Płońsk County, Masovian Voivodeship, in east-central Poland.
