= Strożęcin =

- Village
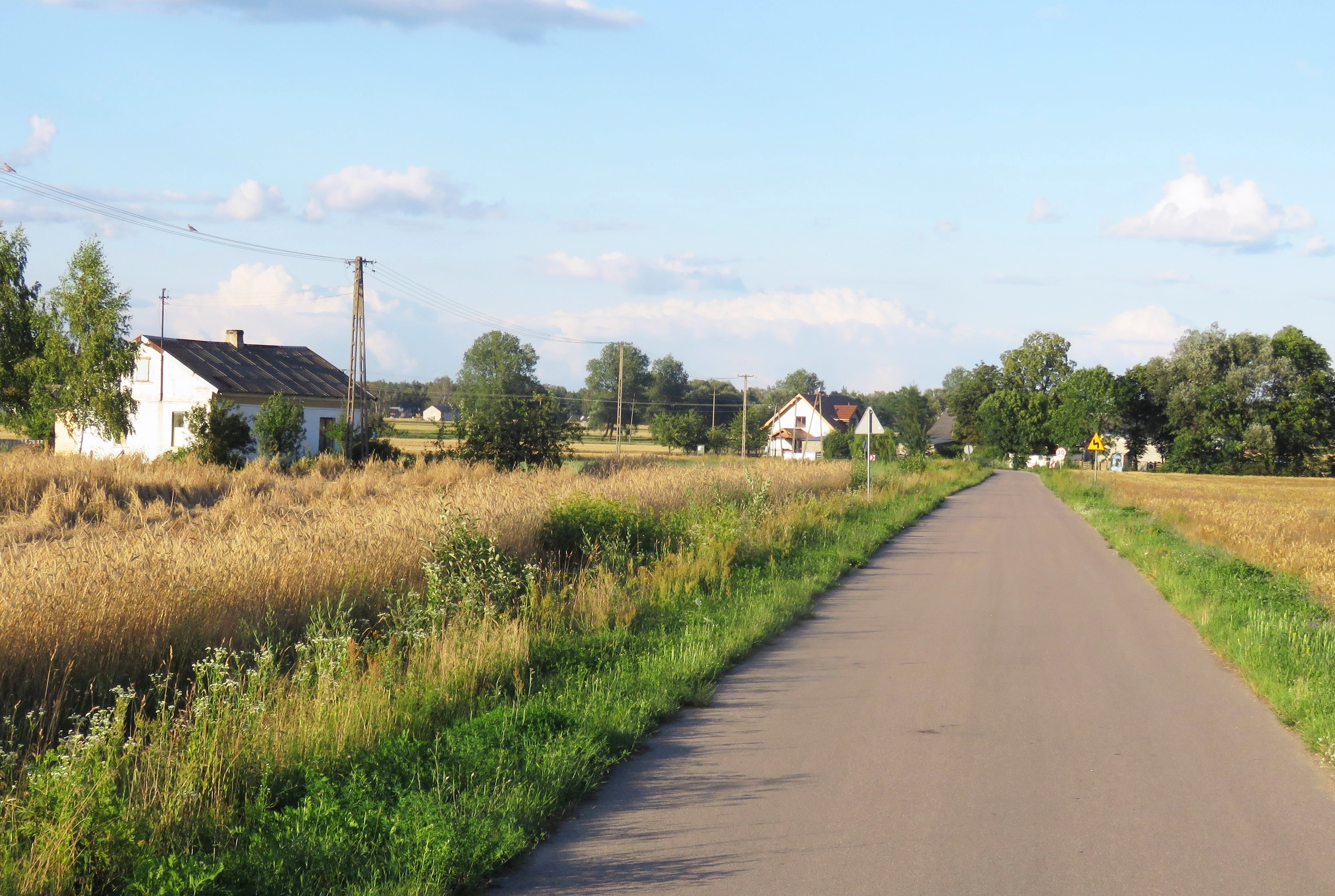

- Location within Poland
- Coordinates: 52°44′00″N 20°07′47″E
- Country: Poland
- Voivodeship: Masovian
- County: Płońsk
- Gmina: Raciąż

Strożęcin [strɔˈʐɛnt͡ɕin] is a village in the administrative district of Gmina Raciąż, within Płońsk County, Masovian Voivodeship, in east-central Poland.
