= Kraszewo-Falki =

- Village
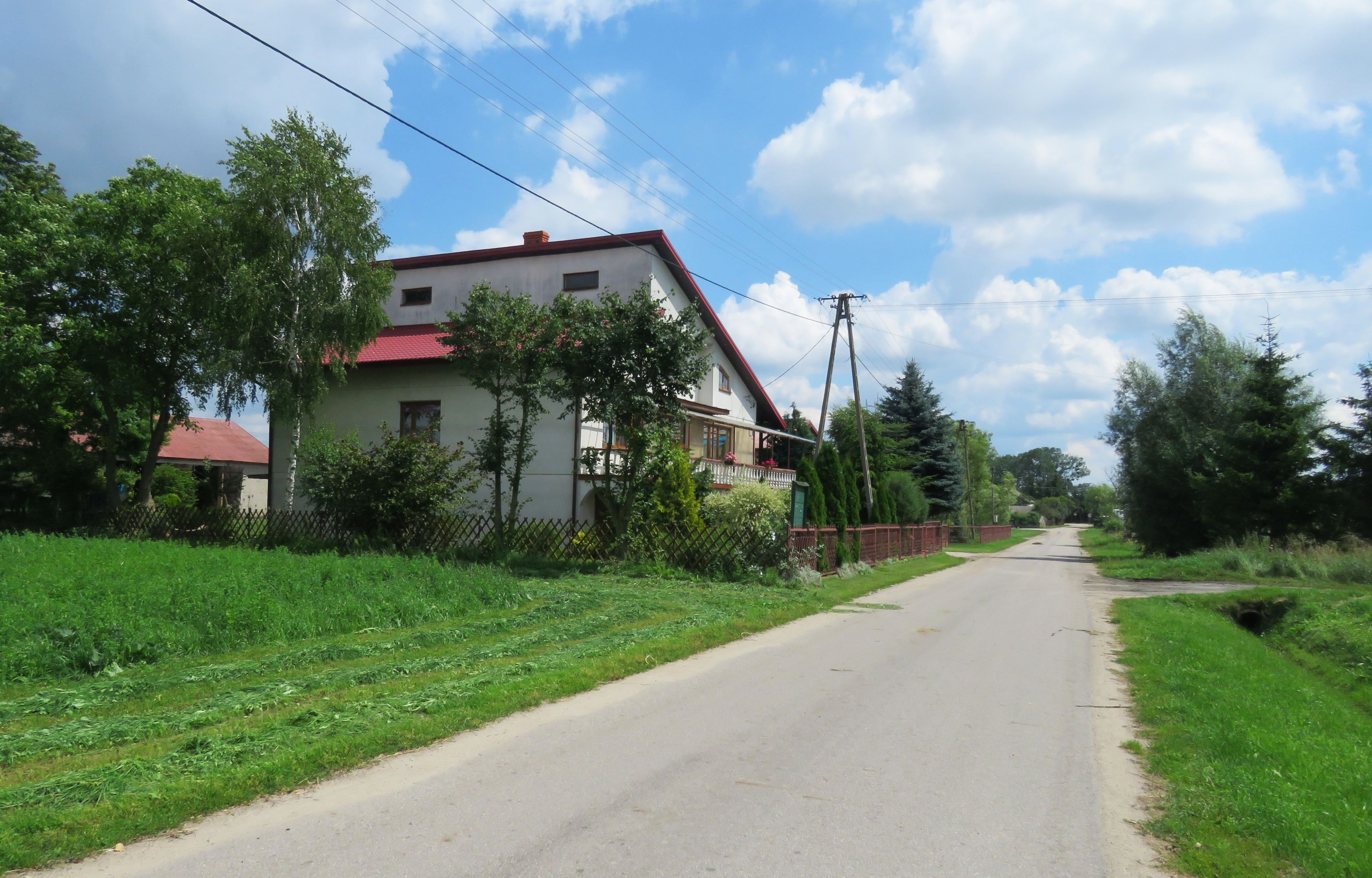
- Roadside house in Kraszewo-Falki

- Location within Poland
- Coordinates: 52°47′26″N 20°02′07″E
- Country: Poland
- Voivodeship: Masovian
- County: Płońsk
- Gmina: Raciąż

Kraszewo-Falki [kraˈʂɛvɔ ˈfalki] is a village in the administrative district of Gmina Raciąż, within Płońsk County, Masovian Voivodeship, in east-central Poland.
