= Nowy Komunin =

- Village
- Location within Poland
- Coordinates: 52°51′05″N 20°14′06″E
- Country: Poland
- Voivodeship: Masovian
- County: Płońsk
- Gmina: Raciąż

Nowy Komunin [ˈnɔvɨ kɔˈmunin] is a village in the administrative district of Gmina Raciąż, within Płońsk County, Masovian Voivodeship, in east-central Poland.
