= Kruszenica =

- Village
- Location within Poland
- Coordinates: 52°47′N 20°15′E
- Country: Poland
- Voivodeship: Masovian
- County: Płońsk
- Gmina: Raciąż

Kruszenica [kruʂɛˈnit͡sa] is a village located in the administrative district of Gmina Raciąż, within Płońsk County, Masovian Voivodeship, in east-central Poland.
