= Sikory, Płońsk County =

Sikory
- Village
- Location within Poland
- Coordinates: 52°51′35″N 20°08′44″E
- Country: Poland
- Voivodeship: Masovian
- County: Płońsk
- Gmina: Raciąż

Sikory is a village in the administrative district of Gmina Raciąż, within Płońsk County, Masovian Voivodeship, in east-central Poland.
