= Witkowo, Masovian Voivodeship =

Witkowo
- Village
- Location within Poland
- Coordinates: 52°46′N 20°7′E
- Country: Poland
- Voivodeship: Masovian
- County: Płońsk
- Gmina: Raciąż

Witkowo [vitˈkɔvɔ] is a village in the administrative district of Gmina Raciąż, within Płońsk County, Masovian Voivodeship, in east-central Poland.
