= Żukowo-Wawrzonki =

- Village
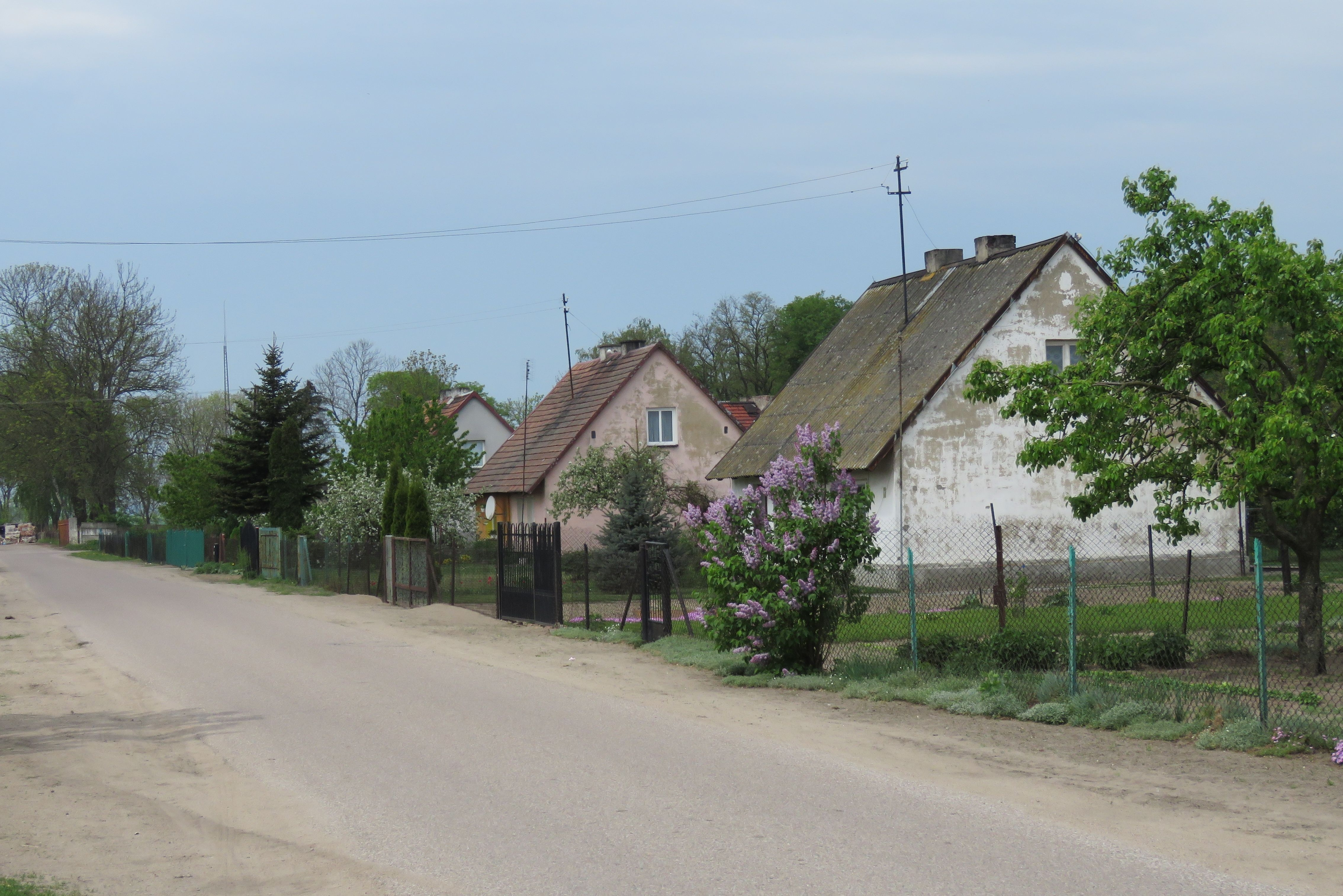

- Location within Poland
- Coordinates: 52°45′47″N 20°3′48″E
- Country: Poland
- Voivodeship: Masovian
- County: Płońsk
- Gmina: Raciąż

Żukowo-Wawrzonki [ʐuˈkɔvɔ vaˈvʐɔŋki] is a village in the administrative district of Gmina Raciąż, within Płońsk County, Masovian Voivodeship, in east-central Poland.
