= Żukowo-Strusie =

- Village
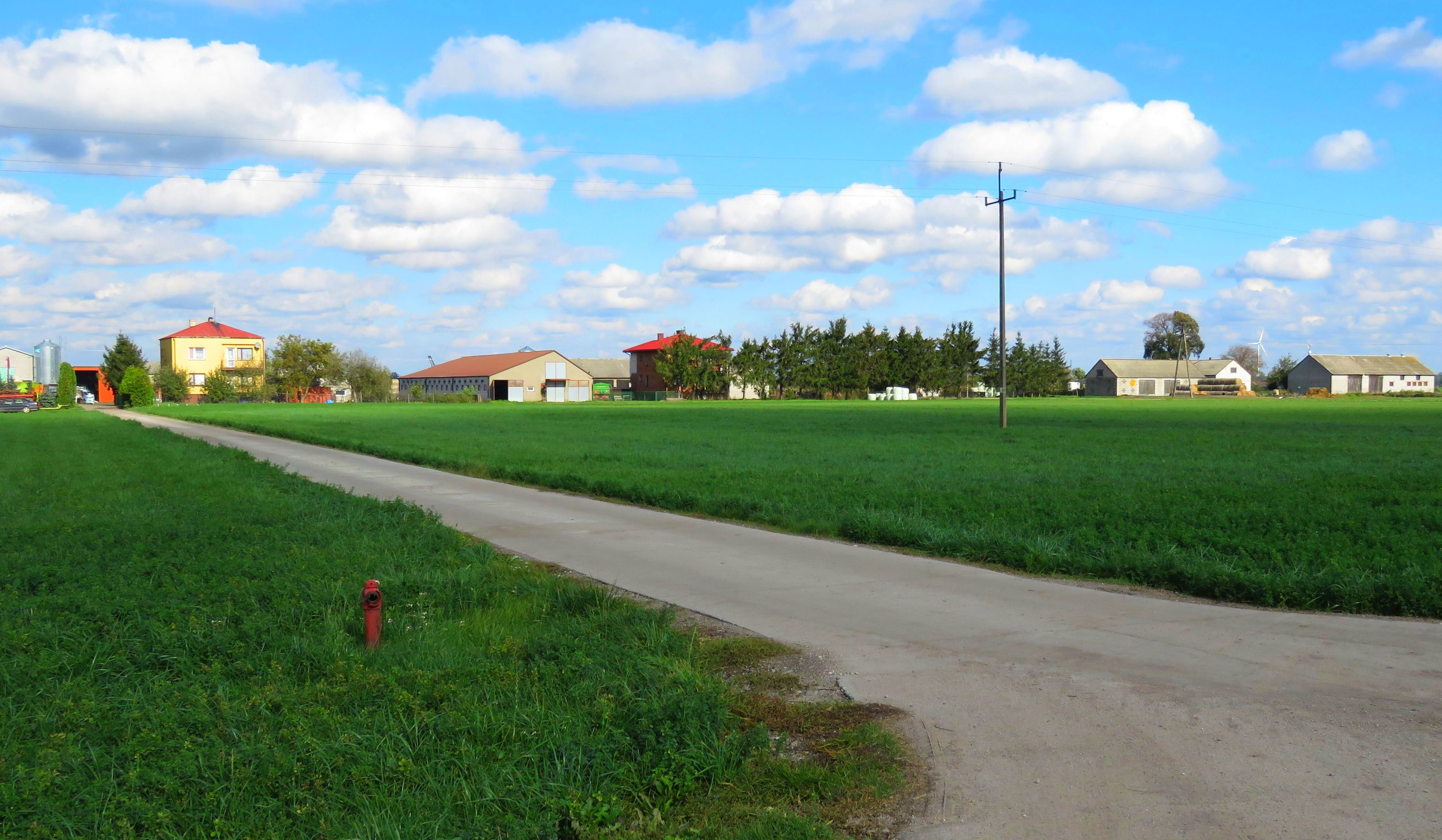

- Location within Poland
- Coordinates: 52°46′34″N 20°02′18″E
- Country: Poland
- Voivodeship: Masovian
- County: Płońsk
- Gmina: Raciąż

Żukowo-Strusie [ʐuˈkɔvɔ ˈstruɕɛ] is a village in the administrative district of Gmina Raciąż, within Płońsk County, Masovian Voivodeship, in east-central Poland.
