= Kiełbowo =

- Village
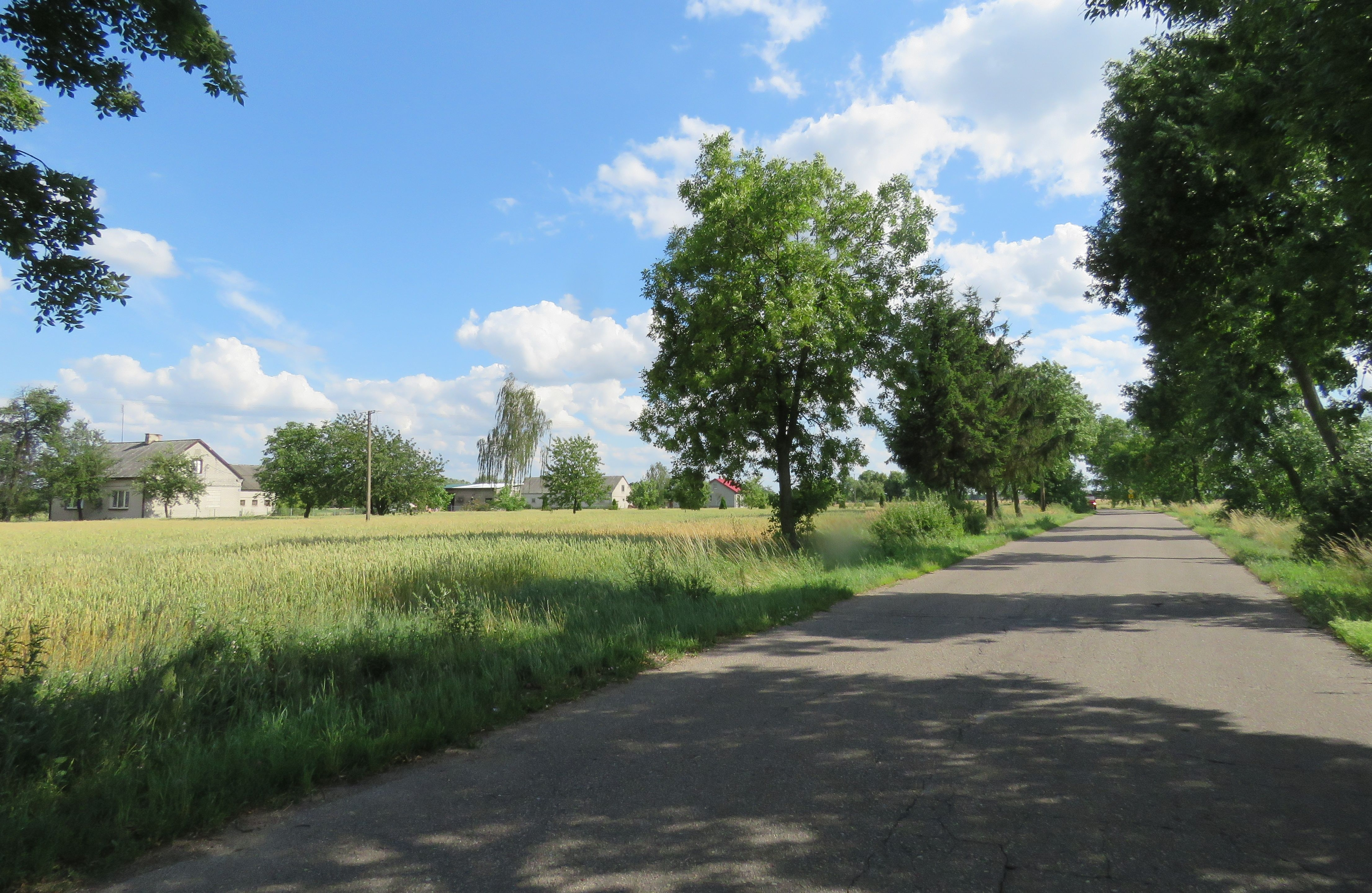

- Location within Poland
- Coordinates: 52°44′N 20°6′E
- Country: Poland
- Voivodeship: Masovian
- County: Płońsk
- Gmina: Raciąż

Kiełbowo [kʲɛu̯ˈbɔvɔ] is a village in the administrative district of Gmina Raciąż, within Płońsk County, Masovian Voivodeship, in east-central Poland.
