= Lipa, Płońsk County =

Lipa
- Village
- Location within Poland
- Coordinates: 52°49′13″N 20°12′03″E
- Country: Poland
- Voivodeship: Masovian
- County: Płońsk
- Gmina: Raciąż

Lipa [ˈlipa] is a village in the administrative district of Gmina Raciąż, within Płońsk County, Masovian Voivodeship, in east-central Poland.
