= Kocięcin-Brodowy =

- Village
- Location within Poland
- Coordinates: 52°51′N 20°12′E
- Country: Poland
- Voivodeship: Masovian
- County: Płońsk
- Gmina: Raciąż

Kocięcin-Brodowy [kɔˈt͡ɕɛnt͡ɕin brɔˈdɔvɨ] is a village in the administrative district of Gmina Raciąż, within Płońsk County, Masovian Voivodeship, in east-central Poland.
