= Stare Młodochowo =

- Village
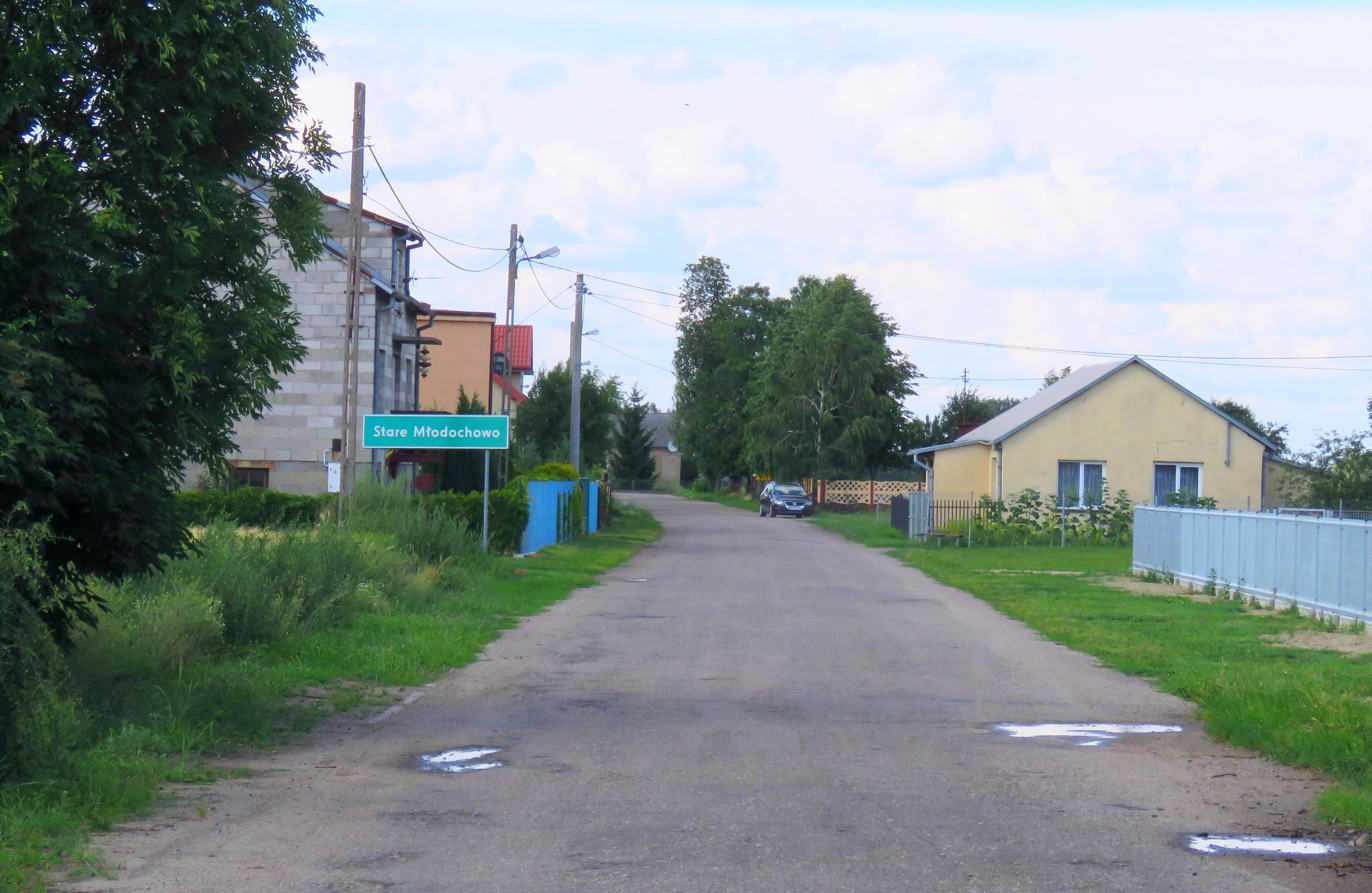

- Location within Poland
- Coordinates: 52°43′18″N 20°3′56″E
- Country: Poland
- Voivodeship: Masovian
- County: Płońsk
- Gmina: Raciąż
- Population: 70

Stare Młodochowo (Polish pronunciation: [ˈstarɛ mwɔdɔˈxɔvɔ]) is a village in the administrative district of Gmina Raciąż, within Płońsk County, Masovian Voivodeship, in east-central Poland.
