= Kozolin =

- Village
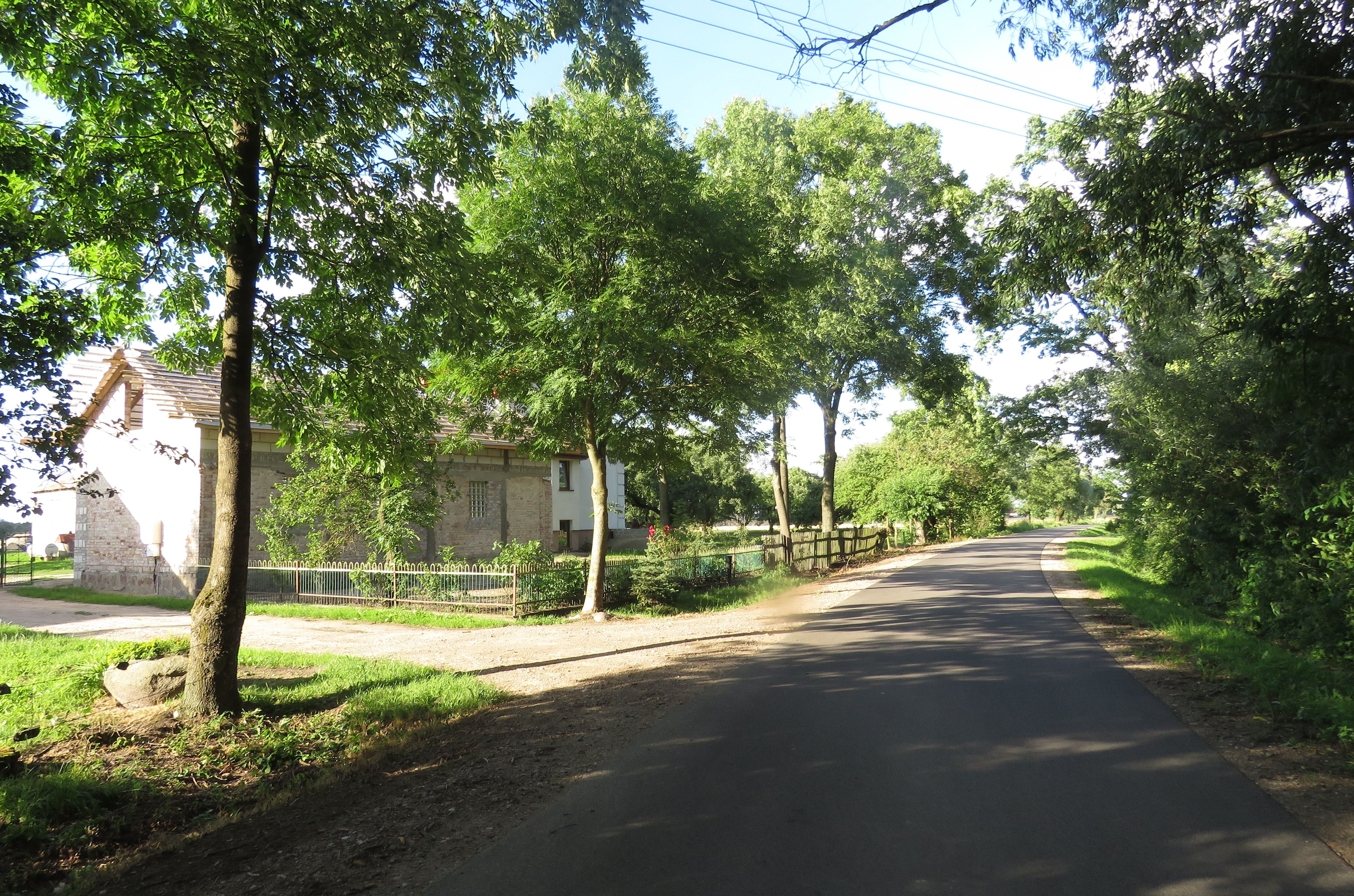

- Location within Poland
- Coordinates: 52°44′N 20°10′E
- Country: Poland
- Voivodeship: Masovian
- County: Płońsk
- Gmina: Raciąż

Kozolin [kɔˈzɔlin] is a village within the administrative district of Gmina Raciąż, in Płońsk County, Masovian Voivodeship, located in east-central Poland.
