= Mała Wieś, Płońsk County =

Mała Wieś
- Village
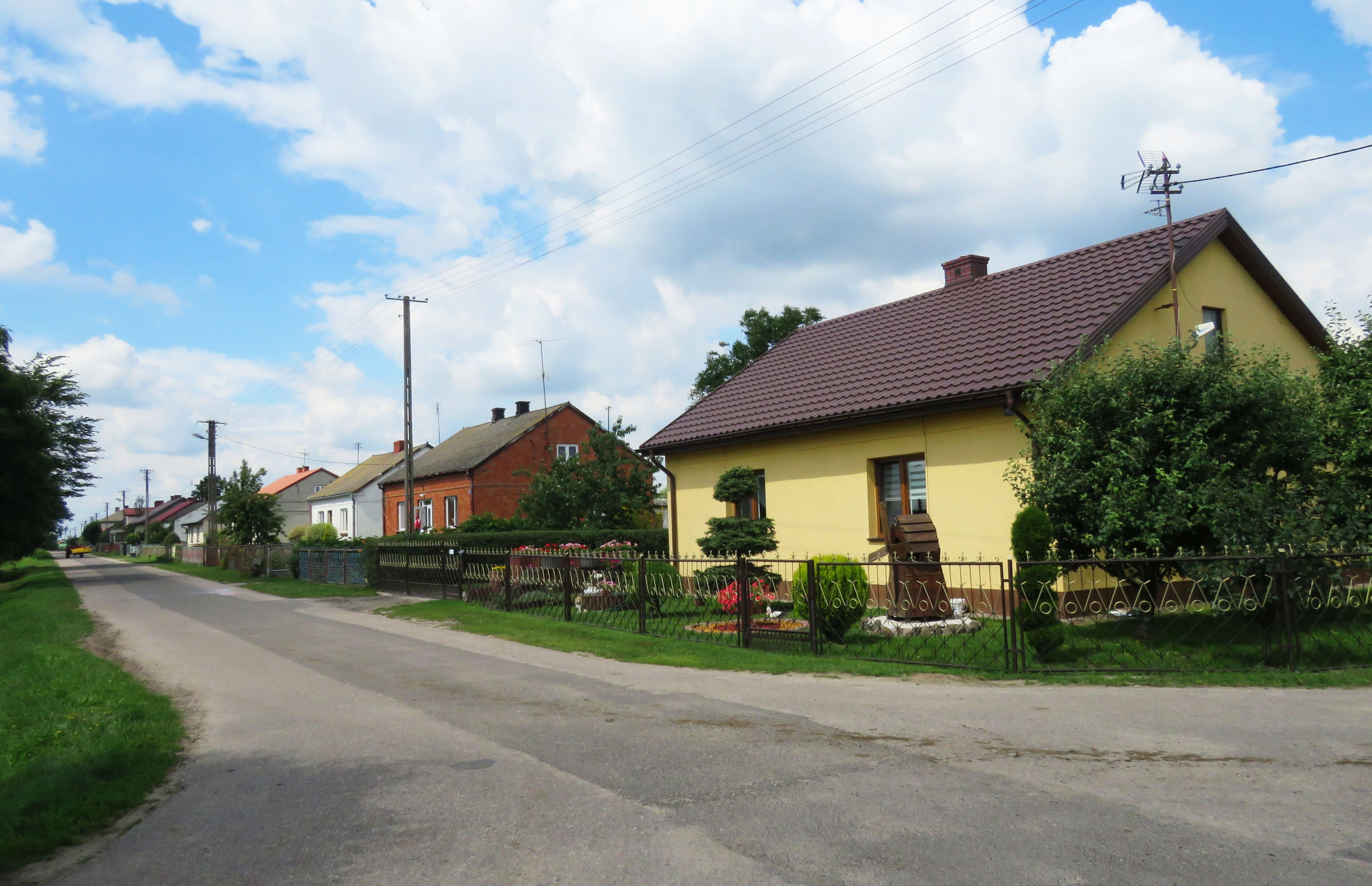

- Location within Poland
- Coordinates: 52°48′N 20°1′E
- Country: Poland
- Voivodeship: Masovian
- County: Płońsk
- Gmina: Raciąż

Mała Wieś [ˈmawa ˈvjɛɕ] is a village in the administrative district of Gmina Raciąż, within Płońsk County, Masovian Voivodeship, in east-central Poland.
