= Nowe Młodochowo =

- Village
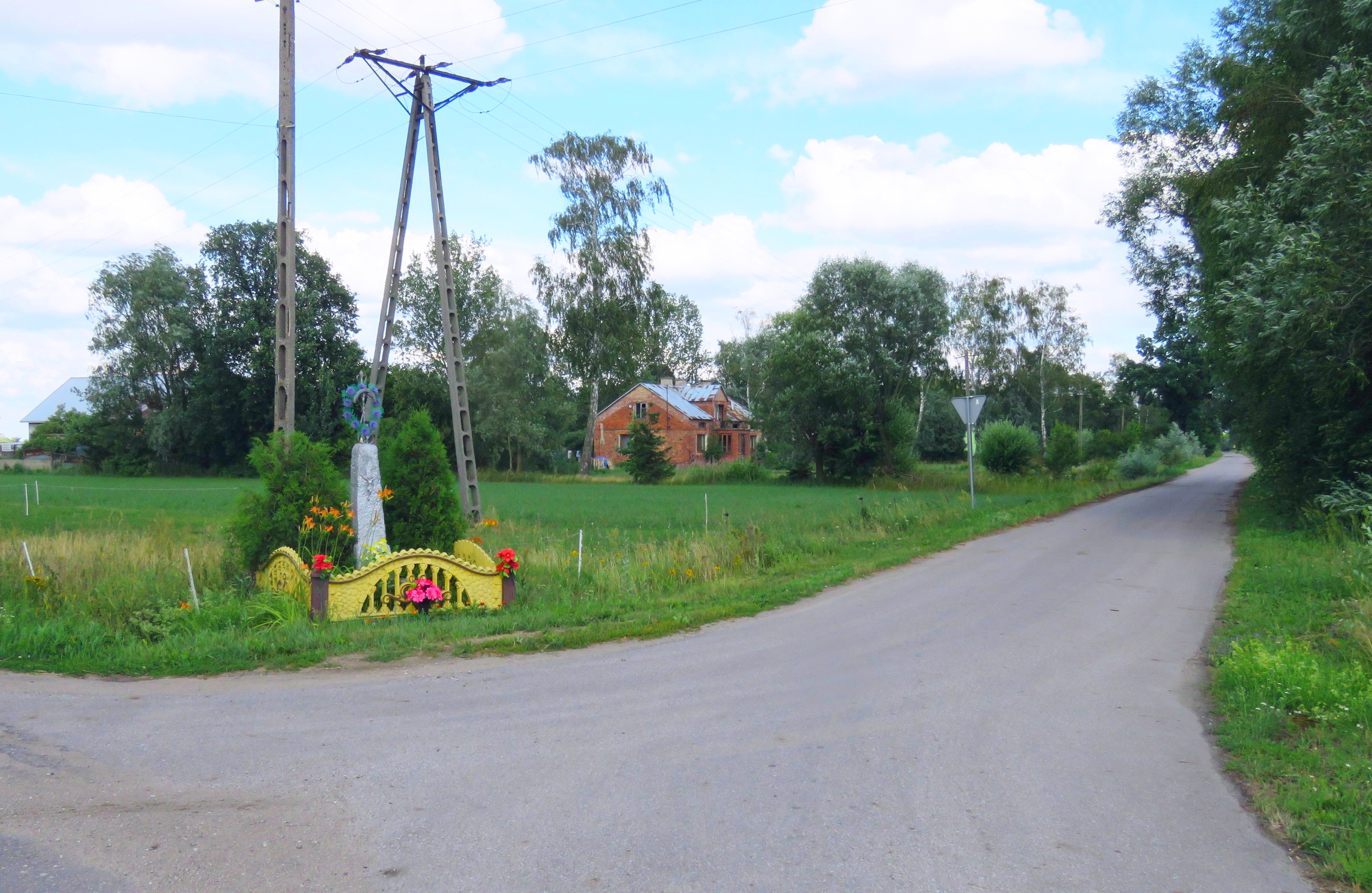

- Location within Poland
- Coordinates: 52°43′30″N 20°03′35″E
- Country: Poland
- Voivodeship: Masovian
- County: Płońsk
- Gmina: Raciąż

Population
  - Total: 65
- Time zone: UTC+1 (CET)
  - Summer (DST): UTC+2 (CEST)

Nowe Młodochowo [ˈnɔvɛ mwɔdɔˈxɔvɔ] is a village in the administrative district of Gmina Raciąż, within Płońsk County, Masovian Voivodeship, in central Poland.

Five Polish citizens were murdered by Nazi Germany in the village during World War II.
