= Kraszewo-Czubaki =

- Village
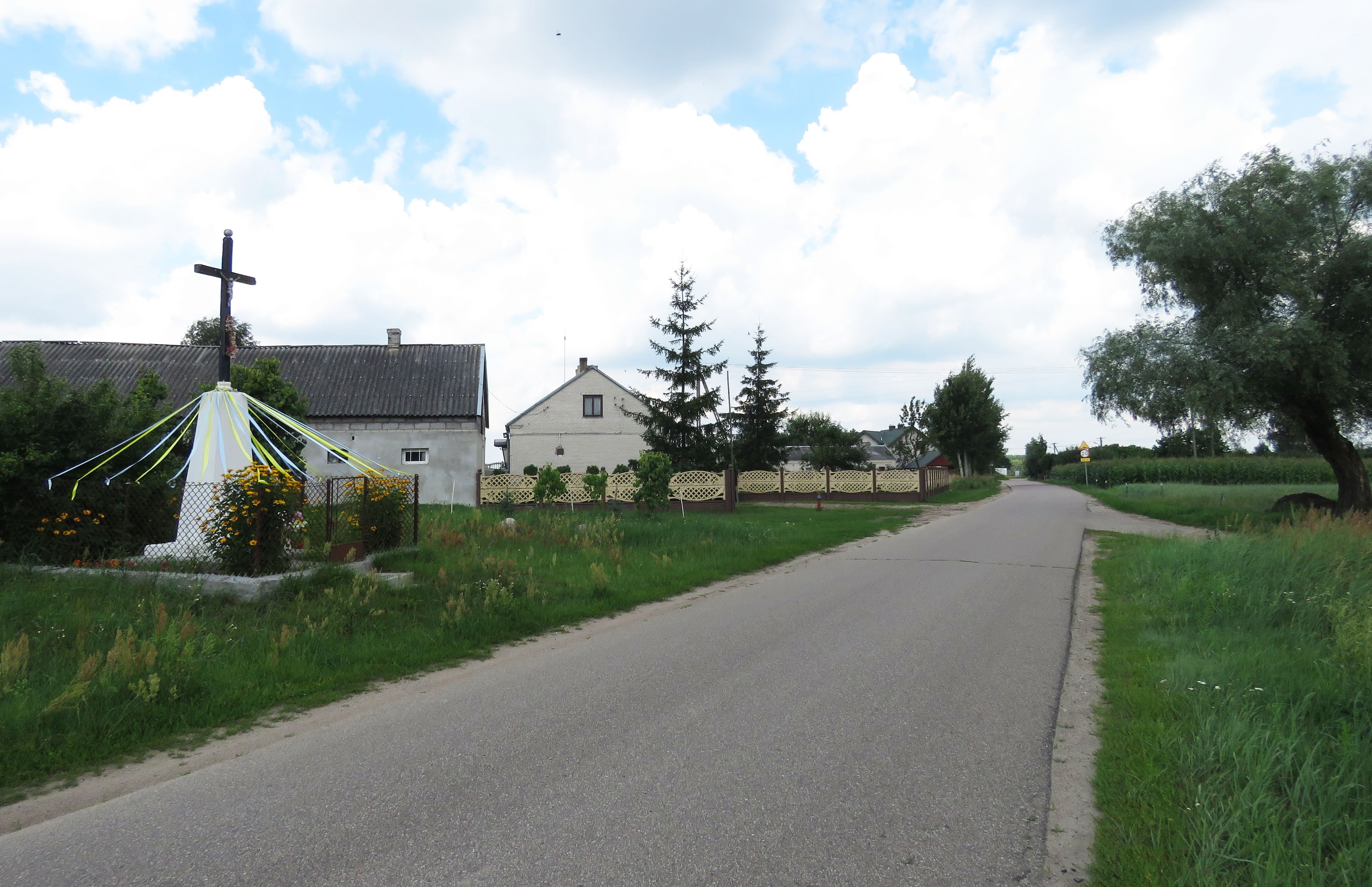
- Wayside cross in Kraszewo-Czubaki

- Location within Poland
- Coordinates: 52°48′51″N 20°03′07″E
- Country: Poland
- Voivodeship: Masovian
- County: Płońsk
- Gmina: Raciąż

Kraszewo-Czubaki [kraˈʂɛvɔ t͡ʂuˈbaki] is a village in the administrative district of Gmina Raciąż, within Płońsk County, Masovian Voivodeship, in east-central Poland.
