= Kraszewo-Rory =

- Village
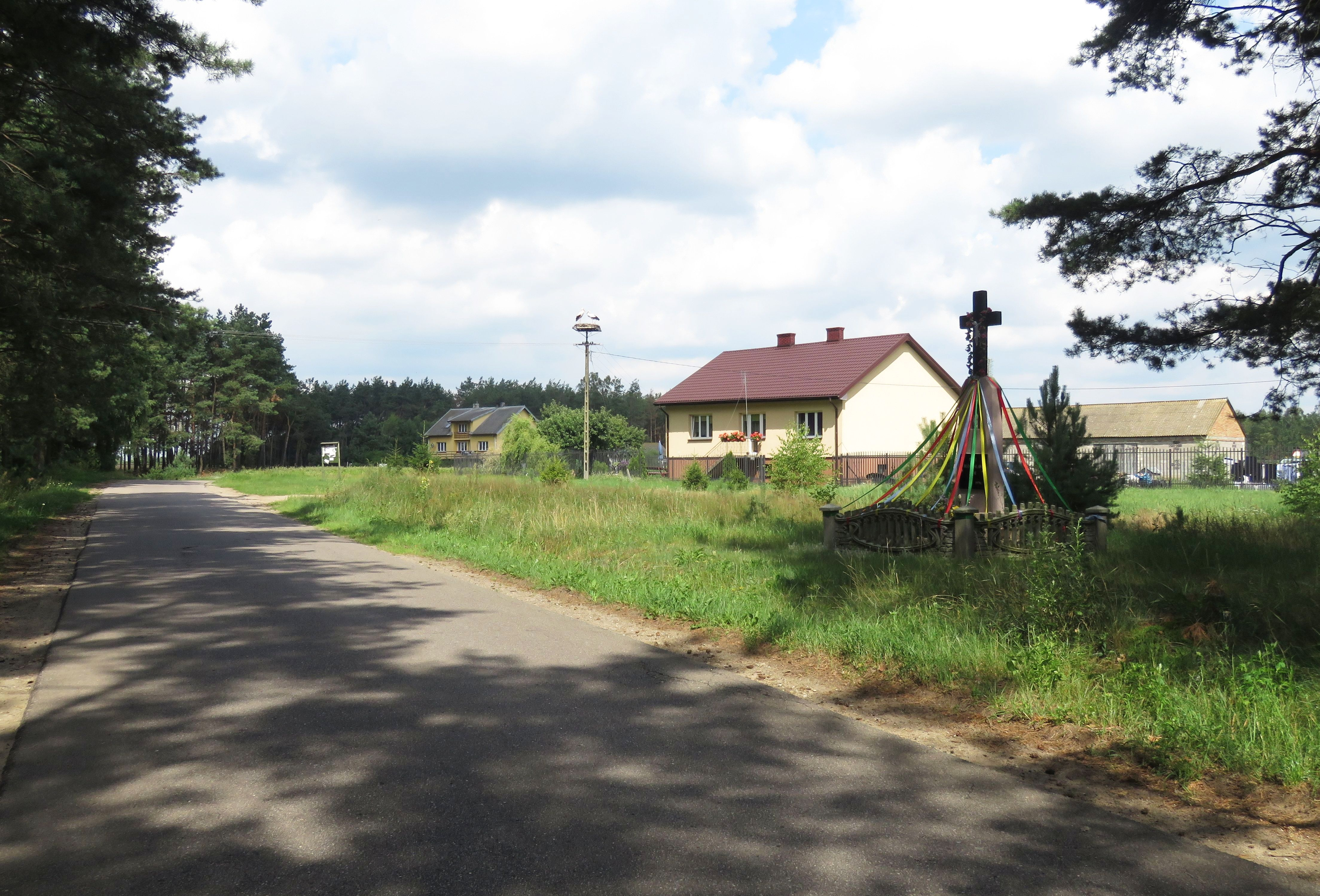
- Roadside house in Kraszewo-Rory

- Location within Poland
- Coordinates: 52°48′17″N 20°03′50″E
- Country: Poland
- Voivodeship: Masovian
- County: Płońsk
- Gmina: Raciąż

Kraszewo-Rory [kraˈʂɛvɔ ˈrɔrɨ] is a village in the administrative district of Gmina Raciąż, within Płońsk County, Masovian Voivodeship, in east-central Poland.
