= Kraszewo-Sławęcin =

Village in Gmina Raciąż, Poland

- Village
- Location within Poland
- Coordinates: 52°47′09″N 20°03′57″E
- Country: Poland
- Voivodeship: Masovian
- County: Płońsk
- Gmina: Raciąż

Kraszewo-Sławęcin [kraˈʂɛvɔ swaˈvɛnt͡ɕin] is a village in the administrative district of Gmina Raciąż, within Płońsk County, Masovian Voivodeship, in east-central Poland.
