= Charzyny =

- Village
- Location within Poland
- Coordinates: 52°52′N 20°11′E
- Country: Poland
- Voivodeship: Masovian
- County: Płońsk
- Gmina: Raciąż

Charzyny [xaˈʐɨnɨ] is a village in the administrative district of Gmina Raciąż, within Płońsk County, Masovian Voivodeship, in east-central Poland.
