= Dobrska-Włościany =

- Village
- Location within Poland
- Coordinates: 52°41′56″N 20°05′44″E
- Country: Poland
- Voivodeship: Masovian
- County: Płońsk
- Gmina: Raciąż

Dobrska-Włościany [ˈdɔbrska vwɔɕˈt͡ɕanɨ] is a village in the administrative district of Gmina Raciąż, within Płońsk County, Masovian Voivodeship, in East-Central Poland.
