= Bogucin, Płońsk County =

Bogucin
- Village
- Location within Poland
- Coordinates: 52°44′34″N 20°4′36″E
- Country: Poland
- Voivodeship: Masovian
- County: Płońsk
- Gmina: Raciąż

Bogucin [bɔˈɡut͡ɕin] is a village in the administrative district of Gmina Raciąż, within Płońsk County, Masovian Voivodeship, in east-central Poland.
