= Stary Niedróż =

- Village
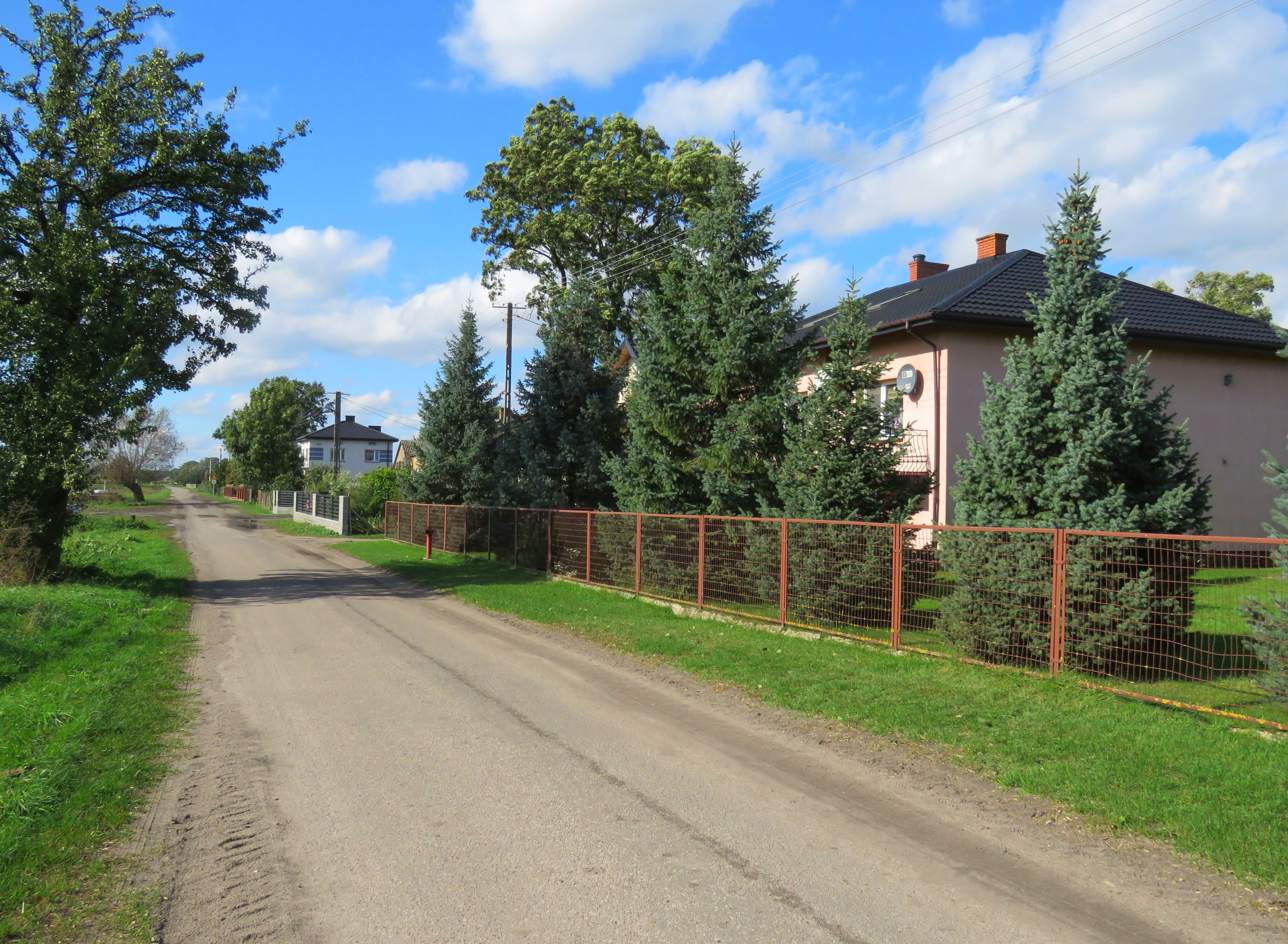

- Location within Poland
- Coordinates: 52°47′5″N 20°0′19″E
- Country: Poland
- Voivodeship: Masovian
- County: Płońsk
- Gmina: Raciąż
- Population: 70

Stary Niedróż [ˈstarɨ ˈɲɛdruʂ] is a village in the administrative district of Gmina Raciąż, within Płońsk County, Masovian Voivodeship, in east-central Poland.
