= Krajkowo-Budki =

- Village
- Location within Poland
- Coordinates: 52°47′02″N 20°13′41″E
- Country: Poland
- Voivodeship: Masovian
- County: Płońsk
- Gmina: Raciąż

Krajkowo-Budki [krai̯ˈkɔvɔ ˈbutki] is a village in the administrative district of Gmina Raciąż, within Płońsk County, Masovian Voivodeship, in east-central Poland.
