= Kocięcin-Tworki =

- Village
- Location within Poland
- Coordinates: 52°51′50″N 20°13′51″E
- Country: Poland
- Voivodeship: Masovian
- County: Płońsk
- Gmina: Raciąż
- Population: 50

Kocięcin-Tworki [kɔˈt͡ɕɛnt͡ɕin ˈtfɔrki] is a village in the administrative district of Gmina Raciąż, within Płońsk County, Masovian Voivodeship, in east-central Poland.
