= Kraszewo Podborne =

- Village
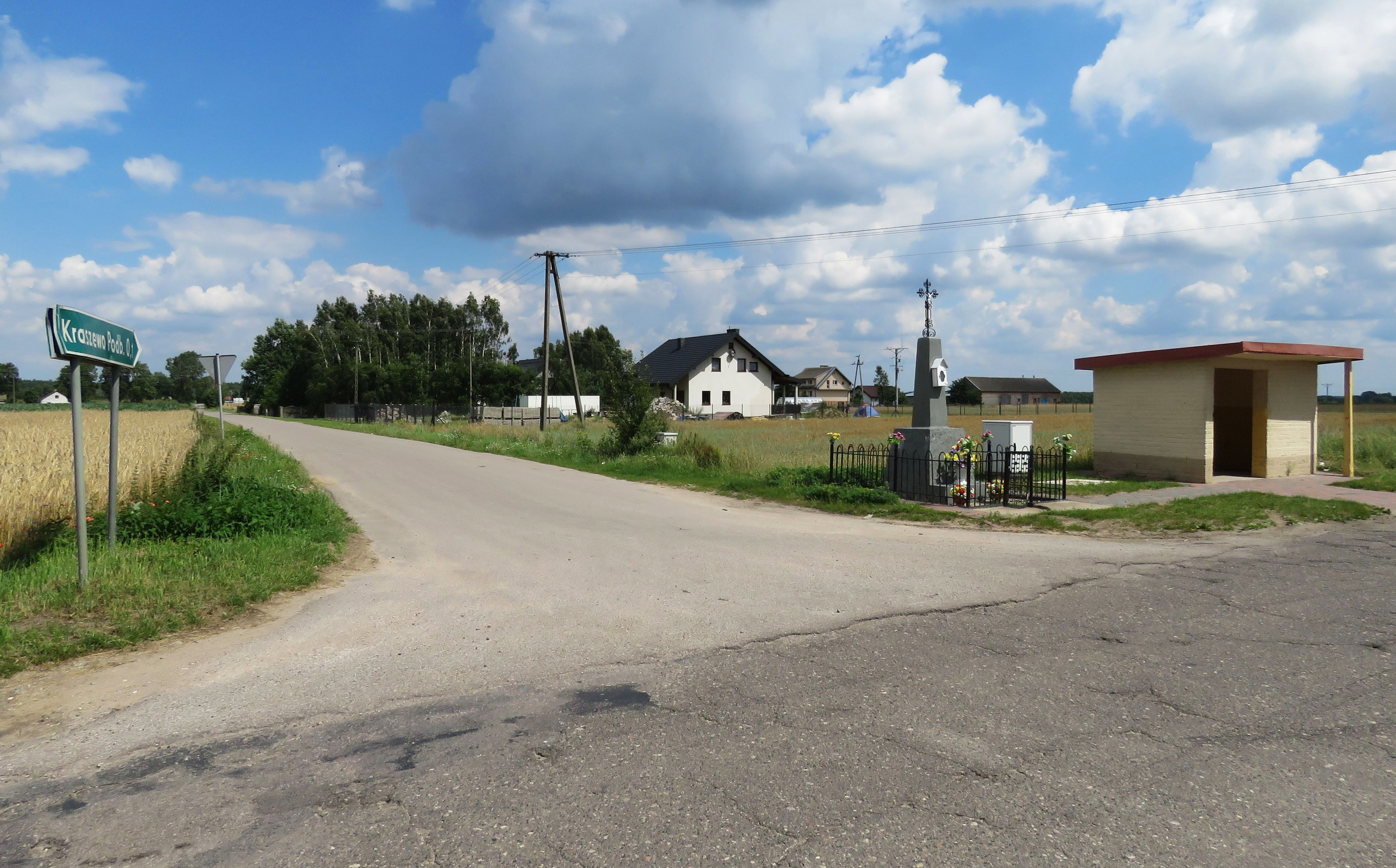

- Location within Poland
- Coordinates: 52°48′N 20°2′E
- Country: Poland
- Voivodeship: Masovian
- County: Płońsk
- Gmina: Raciąż
- Population: 170

Kraszewo Podborne [kraˈʂɛvɔ pɔdˈbɔrnɛ] is a village in the administrative district of Gmina Raciąż, within Płońsk County, Masovian Voivodeship, in east-central Poland.
